

358001–358100 

|-bgcolor=#fefefe
| 358001 ||  || — || February 20, 2006 || Socorro || LINEAR || — || align=right | 1.1 km || 
|-id=002 bgcolor=#fefefe
| 358002 ||  || — || February 20, 2006 || Mount Lemmon || Mount Lemmon Survey || FLO || align=right data-sort-value="0.75" | 750 m || 
|-id=003 bgcolor=#fefefe
| 358003 ||  || — || February 22, 2006 || Kitt Peak || Spacewatch || — || align=right data-sort-value="0.76" | 760 m || 
|-id=004 bgcolor=#fefefe
| 358004 ||  || — || February 23, 2006 || Kitt Peak || Spacewatch || NYS || align=right data-sort-value="0.60" | 600 m || 
|-id=005 bgcolor=#fefefe
| 358005 ||  || — || February 24, 2006 || Kitt Peak || Spacewatch || NYS || align=right data-sort-value="0.76" | 760 m || 
|-id=006 bgcolor=#fefefe
| 358006 ||  || — || February 24, 2006 || Kitt Peak || Spacewatch || ERI || align=right | 1.2 km || 
|-id=007 bgcolor=#fefefe
| 358007 ||  || — || February 24, 2006 || Kitt Peak || Spacewatch || FLO || align=right data-sort-value="0.74" | 740 m || 
|-id=008 bgcolor=#fefefe
| 358008 ||  || — || February 24, 2006 || Kitt Peak || Spacewatch || FLO || align=right data-sort-value="0.57" | 570 m || 
|-id=009 bgcolor=#fefefe
| 358009 ||  || — || February 25, 2006 || Mount Lemmon || Mount Lemmon Survey || NYS || align=right data-sort-value="0.61" | 610 m || 
|-id=010 bgcolor=#fefefe
| 358010 ||  || — || February 25, 2006 || Kitt Peak || Spacewatch || NYS || align=right data-sort-value="0.65" | 650 m || 
|-id=011 bgcolor=#fefefe
| 358011 ||  || — || February 27, 2006 || Kitt Peak || Spacewatch || — || align=right | 2.0 km || 
|-id=012 bgcolor=#fefefe
| 358012 ||  || — || January 23, 2006 || Kitt Peak || Spacewatch || — || align=right data-sort-value="0.86" | 860 m || 
|-id=013 bgcolor=#fefefe
| 358013 ||  || — || February 25, 2006 || Kitt Peak || Spacewatch || — || align=right data-sort-value="0.64" | 640 m || 
|-id=014 bgcolor=#fefefe
| 358014 ||  || — || February 25, 2006 || Mount Lemmon || Mount Lemmon Survey || — || align=right data-sort-value="0.77" | 770 m || 
|-id=015 bgcolor=#fefefe
| 358015 ||  || — || February 25, 2006 || Kitt Peak || Spacewatch || FLO || align=right data-sort-value="0.72" | 720 m || 
|-id=016 bgcolor=#fefefe
| 358016 ||  || — || February 27, 2006 || Kitt Peak || Spacewatch || NYS || align=right data-sort-value="0.66" | 660 m || 
|-id=017 bgcolor=#fefefe
| 358017 ||  || — || February 27, 2006 || Kitt Peak || Spacewatch || FLO || align=right data-sort-value="0.62" | 620 m || 
|-id=018 bgcolor=#fefefe
| 358018 ||  || — || February 27, 2006 || Kitt Peak || Spacewatch || NYS || align=right data-sort-value="0.63" | 630 m || 
|-id=019 bgcolor=#fefefe
| 358019 ||  || — || February 27, 2006 || Mount Lemmon || Mount Lemmon Survey || — || align=right data-sort-value="0.91" | 910 m || 
|-id=020 bgcolor=#fefefe
| 358020 ||  || — || February 27, 2006 || Mount Lemmon || Mount Lemmon Survey || — || align=right data-sort-value="0.91" | 910 m || 
|-id=021 bgcolor=#fefefe
| 358021 ||  || — || January 5, 2006 || Mount Lemmon || Mount Lemmon Survey || — || align=right | 1.1 km || 
|-id=022 bgcolor=#fefefe
| 358022 ||  || — || February 25, 2006 || Mount Lemmon || Mount Lemmon Survey || — || align=right | 1.1 km || 
|-id=023 bgcolor=#fefefe
| 358023 ||  || — || January 31, 2006 || Mount Lemmon || Mount Lemmon Survey || NYS || align=right data-sort-value="0.63" | 630 m || 
|-id=024 bgcolor=#fefefe
| 358024 ||  || — || March 2, 2006 || Kitt Peak || Spacewatch || NYS || align=right data-sort-value="0.51" | 510 m || 
|-id=025 bgcolor=#fefefe
| 358025 ||  || — || March 5, 2006 || Kitt Peak || Spacewatch || V || align=right data-sort-value="0.83" | 830 m || 
|-id=026 bgcolor=#fefefe
| 358026 ||  || — || March 5, 2006 || Kitt Peak || Spacewatch || FLO || align=right data-sort-value="0.77" | 770 m || 
|-id=027 bgcolor=#fefefe
| 358027 ||  || — || January 26, 2006 || Mount Lemmon || Mount Lemmon Survey || — || align=right data-sort-value="0.82" | 820 m || 
|-id=028 bgcolor=#fefefe
| 358028 ||  || — || March 23, 2006 || Kitt Peak || Spacewatch || — || align=right | 1.1 km || 
|-id=029 bgcolor=#fefefe
| 358029 ||  || — || March 2, 1995 || Kitt Peak || Spacewatch || NYS || align=right data-sort-value="0.66" | 660 m || 
|-id=030 bgcolor=#fefefe
| 358030 ||  || — || March 23, 2006 || Kitt Peak || Spacewatch || V || align=right data-sort-value="0.69" | 690 m || 
|-id=031 bgcolor=#d6d6d6
| 358031 ||  || — || March 23, 2006 || Kitt Peak || Spacewatch || SHU3:2 || align=right | 5.9 km || 
|-id=032 bgcolor=#fefefe
| 358032 ||  || — || March 23, 2006 || Kitt Peak || Spacewatch || EUT || align=right data-sort-value="0.58" | 580 m || 
|-id=033 bgcolor=#fefefe
| 358033 ||  || — || March 24, 2006 || Kitt Peak || Spacewatch || — || align=right data-sort-value="0.77" | 770 m || 
|-id=034 bgcolor=#fefefe
| 358034 ||  || — || March 24, 2006 || Mount Lemmon || Mount Lemmon Survey || NYS || align=right data-sort-value="0.62" | 620 m || 
|-id=035 bgcolor=#fefefe
| 358035 ||  || — || March 24, 2006 || Catalina || CSS || — || align=right | 1.1 km || 
|-id=036 bgcolor=#fefefe
| 358036 ||  || — || March 24, 2006 || Socorro || LINEAR || NYS || align=right data-sort-value="0.92" | 920 m || 
|-id=037 bgcolor=#fefefe
| 358037 ||  || — || March 23, 2006 || Kitt Peak || Spacewatch || — || align=right data-sort-value="0.78" | 780 m || 
|-id=038 bgcolor=#fefefe
| 358038 ||  || — || April 2, 2006 || Kitt Peak || Spacewatch || PHO || align=right | 1.3 km || 
|-id=039 bgcolor=#fefefe
| 358039 ||  || — || April 2, 2006 || Kitt Peak || Spacewatch || V || align=right data-sort-value="0.80" | 800 m || 
|-id=040 bgcolor=#fefefe
| 358040 ||  || — || April 2, 2006 || Kitt Peak || Spacewatch || — || align=right | 1.4 km || 
|-id=041 bgcolor=#fefefe
| 358041 ||  || — || April 2, 2006 || Kitt Peak || Spacewatch || NYS || align=right data-sort-value="0.59" | 590 m || 
|-id=042 bgcolor=#fefefe
| 358042 ||  || — || April 2, 2006 || Kitt Peak || Spacewatch || — || align=right data-sort-value="0.66" | 660 m || 
|-id=043 bgcolor=#fefefe
| 358043 ||  || — || April 2, 2006 || Kitt Peak || Spacewatch || MAS || align=right data-sort-value="0.82" | 820 m || 
|-id=044 bgcolor=#fefefe
| 358044 ||  || — || April 2, 2006 || Mount Lemmon || Mount Lemmon Survey || V || align=right data-sort-value="0.74" | 740 m || 
|-id=045 bgcolor=#fefefe
| 358045 ||  || — || April 7, 2006 || Catalina || CSS || PHO || align=right | 1.3 km || 
|-id=046 bgcolor=#FA8072
| 358046 ||  || — || April 7, 2006 || Catalina || CSS || — || align=right | 1.0 km || 
|-id=047 bgcolor=#fefefe
| 358047 ||  || — || April 2, 2006 || Catalina || CSS || PHO || align=right | 1.6 km || 
|-id=048 bgcolor=#fefefe
| 358048 ||  || — || April 8, 2006 || Kitt Peak || Spacewatch || KLI || align=right | 2.2 km || 
|-id=049 bgcolor=#fefefe
| 358049 ||  || — || April 19, 2006 || Kitt Peak || Spacewatch || — || align=right data-sort-value="0.94" | 940 m || 
|-id=050 bgcolor=#fefefe
| 358050 ||  || — || April 20, 2006 || Kitt Peak || Spacewatch || V || align=right data-sort-value="0.77" | 770 m || 
|-id=051 bgcolor=#fefefe
| 358051 ||  || — || April 18, 2006 || Kitt Peak || Spacewatch || — || align=right | 1.6 km || 
|-id=052 bgcolor=#fefefe
| 358052 ||  || — || April 19, 2006 || Mount Lemmon || Mount Lemmon Survey || FLO || align=right data-sort-value="0.65" | 650 m || 
|-id=053 bgcolor=#fefefe
| 358053 ||  || — || April 20, 2006 || Kitt Peak || Spacewatch || NYS || align=right data-sort-value="0.73" | 730 m || 
|-id=054 bgcolor=#fefefe
| 358054 ||  || — || April 20, 2006 || Kitt Peak || Spacewatch || NYS || align=right data-sort-value="0.74" | 740 m || 
|-id=055 bgcolor=#fefefe
| 358055 ||  || — || April 20, 2006 || Kitt Peak || Spacewatch || — || align=right data-sort-value="0.98" | 980 m || 
|-id=056 bgcolor=#fefefe
| 358056 ||  || — || April 20, 2006 || Kitt Peak || Spacewatch || — || align=right | 1.0 km || 
|-id=057 bgcolor=#fefefe
| 358057 ||  || — || April 19, 2006 || Mount Lemmon || Mount Lemmon Survey || — || align=right data-sort-value="0.74" | 740 m || 
|-id=058 bgcolor=#fefefe
| 358058 ||  || — || April 20, 2006 || Kitt Peak || Spacewatch || — || align=right data-sort-value="0.75" | 750 m || 
|-id=059 bgcolor=#fefefe
| 358059 ||  || — || April 24, 2006 || Mount Lemmon || Mount Lemmon Survey || MAS || align=right data-sort-value="0.59" | 590 m || 
|-id=060 bgcolor=#FA8072
| 358060 ||  || — || April 25, 2006 || Socorro || LINEAR || — || align=right data-sort-value="0.73" | 730 m || 
|-id=061 bgcolor=#fefefe
| 358061 ||  || — || April 24, 2006 || Kitt Peak || Spacewatch || NYS || align=right data-sort-value="0.64" | 640 m || 
|-id=062 bgcolor=#fefefe
| 358062 ||  || — || April 2, 2006 || Kitt Peak || Spacewatch || NYS || align=right data-sort-value="0.83" | 830 m || 
|-id=063 bgcolor=#fefefe
| 358063 ||  || — || April 24, 2006 || Kitt Peak || Spacewatch || — || align=right data-sort-value="0.78" | 780 m || 
|-id=064 bgcolor=#fefefe
| 358064 ||  || — || April 25, 2006 || Kitt Peak || Spacewatch || FLO || align=right data-sort-value="0.59" | 590 m || 
|-id=065 bgcolor=#fefefe
| 358065 ||  || — || March 25, 2006 || Kitt Peak || Spacewatch || FLO || align=right data-sort-value="0.80" | 800 m || 
|-id=066 bgcolor=#fefefe
| 358066 ||  || — || April 26, 2006 || Kitt Peak || Spacewatch || NYS || align=right data-sort-value="0.59" | 590 m || 
|-id=067 bgcolor=#fefefe
| 358067 ||  || — || April 26, 2006 || Kitt Peak || Spacewatch || — || align=right | 1.3 km || 
|-id=068 bgcolor=#fefefe
| 358068 ||  || — || April 26, 2006 || Kitt Peak || Spacewatch || NYS || align=right data-sort-value="0.81" | 810 m || 
|-id=069 bgcolor=#fefefe
| 358069 ||  || — || April 8, 2006 || Catalina || CSS || — || align=right data-sort-value="0.83" | 830 m || 
|-id=070 bgcolor=#E9E9E9
| 358070 ||  || — || April 30, 2006 || Kitt Peak || Spacewatch || DOR || align=right | 2.5 km || 
|-id=071 bgcolor=#fefefe
| 358071 ||  || — || April 21, 2006 || Catalina || CSS || — || align=right data-sort-value="0.99" | 990 m || 
|-id=072 bgcolor=#fefefe
| 358072 ||  || — || April 30, 2006 || Kitt Peak || Spacewatch || V || align=right data-sort-value="0.83" | 830 m || 
|-id=073 bgcolor=#fefefe
| 358073 ||  || — || April 30, 2006 || Kitt Peak || Spacewatch || — || align=right data-sort-value="0.93" | 930 m || 
|-id=074 bgcolor=#fefefe
| 358074 ||  || — || April 8, 2006 || Kitt Peak || Spacewatch || — || align=right data-sort-value="0.93" | 930 m || 
|-id=075 bgcolor=#fefefe
| 358075 ||  || — || May 2, 2006 || Kitt Peak || Spacewatch || NYS || align=right data-sort-value="0.63" | 630 m || 
|-id=076 bgcolor=#fefefe
| 358076 ||  || — || May 2, 2006 || Mount Lemmon || Mount Lemmon Survey || V || align=right data-sort-value="0.66" | 660 m || 
|-id=077 bgcolor=#fefefe
| 358077 ||  || — || May 3, 2006 || Mount Lemmon || Mount Lemmon Survey || MAS || align=right data-sort-value="0.88" | 880 m || 
|-id=078 bgcolor=#fefefe
| 358078 ||  || — || May 1, 2006 || Kitt Peak || Spacewatch || MAS || align=right data-sort-value="0.85" | 850 m || 
|-id=079 bgcolor=#fefefe
| 358079 ||  || — || May 1, 2006 || Kitt Peak || Spacewatch || NYS || align=right data-sort-value="0.61" | 610 m || 
|-id=080 bgcolor=#fefefe
| 358080 ||  || — || May 1, 2006 || Kitt Peak || Spacewatch || V || align=right data-sort-value="0.63" | 630 m || 
|-id=081 bgcolor=#fefefe
| 358081 ||  || — || May 2, 2006 || Mount Lemmon || Mount Lemmon Survey || MAS || align=right data-sort-value="0.68" | 680 m || 
|-id=082 bgcolor=#fefefe
| 358082 ||  || — || May 2, 2006 || Mount Lemmon || Mount Lemmon Survey || V || align=right data-sort-value="0.59" | 590 m || 
|-id=083 bgcolor=#fefefe
| 358083 ||  || — || May 2, 2006 || Kitt Peak || Spacewatch || — || align=right data-sort-value="0.87" | 870 m || 
|-id=084 bgcolor=#fefefe
| 358084 ||  || — || May 3, 2006 || Reedy Creek || J. Broughton || — || align=right | 1.6 km || 
|-id=085 bgcolor=#fefefe
| 358085 ||  || — || May 3, 2006 || Reedy Creek || J. Broughton || V || align=right data-sort-value="0.89" | 890 m || 
|-id=086 bgcolor=#fefefe
| 358086 ||  || — || May 3, 2006 || Kitt Peak || Spacewatch || — || align=right data-sort-value="0.88" | 880 m || 
|-id=087 bgcolor=#fefefe
| 358087 ||  || — || May 3, 2006 || Kitt Peak || Spacewatch || — || align=right data-sort-value="0.94" | 940 m || 
|-id=088 bgcolor=#fefefe
| 358088 ||  || — || May 3, 2006 || Kitt Peak || Spacewatch || — || align=right data-sort-value="0.93" | 930 m || 
|-id=089 bgcolor=#fefefe
| 358089 ||  || — || February 7, 2002 || Kitt Peak || Spacewatch || NYS || align=right data-sort-value="0.54" | 540 m || 
|-id=090 bgcolor=#d6d6d6
| 358090 ||  || — || May 2, 2006 || Mount Lemmon || Mount Lemmon Survey || — || align=right | 2.4 km || 
|-id=091 bgcolor=#fefefe
| 358091 ||  || — || May 1, 2006 || Kitt Peak || M. W. Buie || MAS || align=right data-sort-value="0.70" | 700 m || 
|-id=092 bgcolor=#fefefe
| 358092 ||  || — || May 9, 2006 || Mount Lemmon || Mount Lemmon Survey || — || align=right | 1.0 km || 
|-id=093 bgcolor=#fefefe
| 358093 ||  || — || May 19, 2006 || Mount Lemmon || Mount Lemmon Survey || — || align=right data-sort-value="0.89" | 890 m || 
|-id=094 bgcolor=#fefefe
| 358094 ||  || — || May 19, 2006 || Mount Lemmon || Mount Lemmon Survey || — || align=right | 1.2 km || 
|-id=095 bgcolor=#fefefe
| 358095 ||  || — || May 19, 2006 || Mount Lemmon || Mount Lemmon Survey || NYS || align=right data-sort-value="0.69" | 690 m || 
|-id=096 bgcolor=#fefefe
| 358096 ||  || — || May 22, 2006 || Mount Lemmon || Mount Lemmon Survey || FLO || align=right data-sort-value="0.61" | 610 m || 
|-id=097 bgcolor=#fefefe
| 358097 ||  || — || May 21, 2006 || Catalina || CSS || PHO || align=right | 1.2 km || 
|-id=098 bgcolor=#fefefe
| 358098 ||  || — || May 19, 2006 || Mount Lemmon || Mount Lemmon Survey || V || align=right data-sort-value="0.87" | 870 m || 
|-id=099 bgcolor=#fefefe
| 358099 ||  || — || May 18, 2006 || Palomar || NEAT || NYS || align=right data-sort-value="0.84" | 840 m || 
|-id=100 bgcolor=#fefefe
| 358100 ||  || — || May 20, 2006 || Kitt Peak || Spacewatch || — || align=right data-sort-value="0.62" | 620 m || 
|}

358101–358200 

|-bgcolor=#fefefe
| 358101 ||  || — || May 21, 2006 || Kitt Peak || Spacewatch || MAS || align=right data-sort-value="0.69" | 690 m || 
|-id=102 bgcolor=#fefefe
| 358102 ||  || — || May 23, 2006 || Mount Lemmon || Mount Lemmon Survey || — || align=right data-sort-value="0.89" | 890 m || 
|-id=103 bgcolor=#fefefe
| 358103 ||  || — || February 13, 2002 || Apache Point || SDSS || NYS || align=right data-sort-value="0.71" | 710 m || 
|-id=104 bgcolor=#fefefe
| 358104 ||  || — || May 26, 2006 || Socorro || LINEAR || PHO || align=right data-sort-value="0.98" | 980 m || 
|-id=105 bgcolor=#fefefe
| 358105 ||  || — || May 24, 2006 || Mount Lemmon || Mount Lemmon Survey || FLO || align=right data-sort-value="0.70" | 700 m || 
|-id=106 bgcolor=#fefefe
| 358106 ||  || — || May 25, 2006 || Kitt Peak || Spacewatch || — || align=right | 1.0 km || 
|-id=107 bgcolor=#fefefe
| 358107 ||  || — || May 31, 2006 || Mount Lemmon || Mount Lemmon Survey || ERI || align=right | 1.5 km || 
|-id=108 bgcolor=#fefefe
| 358108 ||  || — || May 29, 2006 || Kitt Peak || Spacewatch || — || align=right data-sort-value="0.74" | 740 m || 
|-id=109 bgcolor=#FA8072
| 358109 ||  || — || May 30, 2006 || Siding Spring || SSS || — || align=right | 1.8 km || 
|-id=110 bgcolor=#fefefe
| 358110 || 2006 OF || — || July 16, 2006 || Needville || Needville Obs. || — || align=right data-sort-value="0.84" | 840 m || 
|-id=111 bgcolor=#E9E9E9
| 358111 ||  || — || July 21, 2006 || Mount Lemmon || Mount Lemmon Survey || HEN || align=right | 1.1 km || 
|-id=112 bgcolor=#E9E9E9
| 358112 ||  || — || July 21, 2006 || Catalina || CSS || — || align=right | 2.5 km || 
|-id=113 bgcolor=#E9E9E9
| 358113 ||  || — || July 18, 2006 || Siding Spring || SSS || EUN || align=right | 1.3 km || 
|-id=114 bgcolor=#E9E9E9
| 358114 ||  || — || August 12, 2006 || Palomar || NEAT || — || align=right | 1.5 km || 
|-id=115 bgcolor=#E9E9E9
| 358115 ||  || — || August 13, 2006 || Palomar || NEAT || — || align=right | 2.0 km || 
|-id=116 bgcolor=#E9E9E9
| 358116 ||  || — || August 14, 2006 || Siding Spring || SSS || ADE || align=right | 1.9 km || 
|-id=117 bgcolor=#fefefe
| 358117 ||  || — || August 15, 2006 || Palomar || NEAT || H || align=right data-sort-value="0.83" | 830 m || 
|-id=118 bgcolor=#E9E9E9
| 358118 ||  || — || August 13, 2006 || Palomar || NEAT || — || align=right | 1.9 km || 
|-id=119 bgcolor=#E9E9E9
| 358119 ||  || — || August 15, 2006 || Palomar || NEAT || — || align=right | 1.6 km || 
|-id=120 bgcolor=#E9E9E9
| 358120 ||  || — || August 13, 2006 || Palomar || NEAT || — || align=right | 2.8 km || 
|-id=121 bgcolor=#fefefe
| 358121 ||  || — || August 15, 2006 || Palomar || NEAT || MAS || align=right | 1.1 km || 
|-id=122 bgcolor=#E9E9E9
| 358122 ||  || — || August 12, 2006 || Palomar || NEAT || — || align=right data-sort-value="0.83" | 830 m || 
|-id=123 bgcolor=#fefefe
| 358123 ||  || — || August 12, 2006 || Palomar || NEAT || — || align=right data-sort-value="0.99" | 990 m || 
|-id=124 bgcolor=#E9E9E9
| 358124 ||  || — || August 14, 2006 || Palomar || NEAT || — || align=right | 2.5 km || 
|-id=125 bgcolor=#E9E9E9
| 358125 ||  || — || August 18, 2006 || Anderson Mesa || LONEOS || — || align=right | 2.0 km || 
|-id=126 bgcolor=#E9E9E9
| 358126 ||  || — || August 18, 2006 || Anderson Mesa || LONEOS || — || align=right | 1.8 km || 
|-id=127 bgcolor=#E9E9E9
| 358127 ||  || — || August 22, 2006 || Palomar || NEAT || — || align=right | 2.7 km || 
|-id=128 bgcolor=#E9E9E9
| 358128 ||  || — || August 24, 2006 || Palomar || NEAT || — || align=right | 2.3 km || 
|-id=129 bgcolor=#E9E9E9
| 358129 ||  || — || August 16, 2006 || Siding Spring || SSS || — || align=right | 1.6 km || 
|-id=130 bgcolor=#E9E9E9
| 358130 ||  || — || August 27, 2006 || Kitt Peak || Spacewatch || — || align=right | 1.6 km || 
|-id=131 bgcolor=#E9E9E9
| 358131 ||  || — || August 21, 2006 || Kitt Peak || Spacewatch || — || align=right | 3.0 km || 
|-id=132 bgcolor=#E9E9E9
| 358132 ||  || — || August 27, 2006 || Anderson Mesa || LONEOS || DOR || align=right | 3.2 km || 
|-id=133 bgcolor=#E9E9E9
| 358133 ||  || — || August 29, 2006 || Catalina || CSS || MAR || align=right | 1.2 km || 
|-id=134 bgcolor=#E9E9E9
| 358134 ||  || — || August 16, 2006 || Palomar || NEAT || — || align=right | 3.2 km || 
|-id=135 bgcolor=#E9E9E9
| 358135 ||  || — || August 20, 2006 || Palomar || NEAT || — || align=right | 2.4 km || 
|-id=136 bgcolor=#E9E9E9
| 358136 ||  || — || August 24, 2006 || Socorro || LINEAR || — || align=right | 1.1 km || 
|-id=137 bgcolor=#E9E9E9
| 358137 ||  || — || August 24, 2006 || Socorro || LINEAR || GER || align=right | 1.5 km || 
|-id=138 bgcolor=#fefefe
| 358138 ||  || — || August 29, 2006 || Anderson Mesa || LONEOS || H || align=right | 1.0 km || 
|-id=139 bgcolor=#E9E9E9
| 358139 ||  || — || August 18, 2006 || Kitt Peak || Spacewatch || — || align=right | 2.0 km || 
|-id=140 bgcolor=#E9E9E9
| 358140 ||  || — || August 18, 2006 || Kitt Peak || Spacewatch || WIT || align=right | 1.1 km || 
|-id=141 bgcolor=#E9E9E9
| 358141 ||  || — || August 23, 2006 || Cerro Tololo || M. W. Buie || — || align=right | 1.8 km || 
|-id=142 bgcolor=#E9E9E9
| 358142 ||  || — || August 28, 2006 || Apache Point || A. C. Becker || — || align=right data-sort-value="0.92" | 920 m || 
|-id=143 bgcolor=#E9E9E9
| 358143 ||  || — || August 18, 2006 || Kitt Peak || Spacewatch || — || align=right | 2.1 km || 
|-id=144 bgcolor=#E9E9E9
| 358144 ||  || — || August 28, 2006 || Kitt Peak || Spacewatch || NEM || align=right | 2.2 km || 
|-id=145 bgcolor=#E9E9E9
| 358145 ||  || — || September 12, 2006 || Catalina || CSS || HNS || align=right | 1.5 km || 
|-id=146 bgcolor=#E9E9E9
| 358146 ||  || — || September 14, 2006 || Kitt Peak || Spacewatch || — || align=right | 1.9 km || 
|-id=147 bgcolor=#E9E9E9
| 358147 ||  || — || September 14, 2006 || Palomar || NEAT || — || align=right | 1.8 km || 
|-id=148 bgcolor=#E9E9E9
| 358148 ||  || — || September 13, 2006 || Palomar || NEAT || — || align=right | 1.9 km || 
|-id=149 bgcolor=#E9E9E9
| 358149 ||  || — || September 14, 2006 || Kitt Peak || Spacewatch || — || align=right | 1.9 km || 
|-id=150 bgcolor=#E9E9E9
| 358150 ||  || — || September 14, 2006 || Kitt Peak || Spacewatch || — || align=right | 2.2 km || 
|-id=151 bgcolor=#E9E9E9
| 358151 ||  || — || September 14, 2006 || Kitt Peak || Spacewatch || — || align=right | 2.7 km || 
|-id=152 bgcolor=#E9E9E9
| 358152 ||  || — || September 14, 2006 || Kitt Peak || Spacewatch || — || align=right | 1.9 km || 
|-id=153 bgcolor=#E9E9E9
| 358153 ||  || — || September 14, 2006 || Kitt Peak || Spacewatch || — || align=right | 1.6 km || 
|-id=154 bgcolor=#E9E9E9
| 358154 ||  || — || September 14, 2006 || Kitt Peak || Spacewatch || EUN || align=right | 1.4 km || 
|-id=155 bgcolor=#d6d6d6
| 358155 ||  || — || September 15, 2006 || Kitt Peak || Spacewatch || — || align=right | 2.8 km || 
|-id=156 bgcolor=#E9E9E9
| 358156 ||  || — || June 5, 2005 || Kitt Peak || Spacewatch || EUN || align=right | 1.1 km || 
|-id=157 bgcolor=#E9E9E9
| 358157 ||  || — || September 15, 2006 || Kitt Peak || Spacewatch || — || align=right | 1.8 km || 
|-id=158 bgcolor=#E9E9E9
| 358158 ||  || — || September 15, 2006 || Kitt Peak || Spacewatch || HEN || align=right | 1.0 km || 
|-id=159 bgcolor=#E9E9E9
| 358159 ||  || — || September 15, 2006 || Kitt Peak || Spacewatch || — || align=right | 2.4 km || 
|-id=160 bgcolor=#E9E9E9
| 358160 ||  || — || September 15, 2006 || Kitt Peak || Spacewatch || — || align=right | 1.4 km || 
|-id=161 bgcolor=#E9E9E9
| 358161 ||  || — || September 15, 2006 || Kitt Peak || Spacewatch || HEN || align=right | 1.1 km || 
|-id=162 bgcolor=#E9E9E9
| 358162 ||  || — || September 15, 2006 || Kitt Peak || Spacewatch || — || align=right | 2.0 km || 
|-id=163 bgcolor=#E9E9E9
| 358163 ||  || — || September 15, 2006 || Kitt Peak || Spacewatch || — || align=right | 1.1 km || 
|-id=164 bgcolor=#E9E9E9
| 358164 ||  || — || September 15, 2006 || Kitt Peak || Spacewatch || — || align=right | 3.4 km || 
|-id=165 bgcolor=#E9E9E9
| 358165 ||  || — || September 11, 2006 || Apache Point || A. C. Becker || MRX || align=right | 1.2 km || 
|-id=166 bgcolor=#d6d6d6
| 358166 ||  || — || April 9, 1999 || Kitt Peak || Spacewatch || — || align=right | 1.9 km || 
|-id=167 bgcolor=#E9E9E9
| 358167 ||  || — || September 14, 2006 || Mauna Kea || J. Masiero || — || align=right | 1.9 km || 
|-id=168 bgcolor=#fefefe
| 358168 ||  || — || September 16, 2006 || Palomar || NEAT || H || align=right data-sort-value="0.84" | 840 m || 
|-id=169 bgcolor=#fefefe
| 358169 ||  || — || September 17, 2006 || Socorro || LINEAR || H || align=right data-sort-value="0.75" | 750 m || 
|-id=170 bgcolor=#E9E9E9
| 358170 ||  || — || September 17, 2006 || Kitt Peak || Spacewatch || HOF || align=right | 2.4 km || 
|-id=171 bgcolor=#E9E9E9
| 358171 ||  || — || September 18, 2006 || Kitt Peak || Spacewatch || — || align=right data-sort-value="0.88" | 880 m || 
|-id=172 bgcolor=#fefefe
| 358172 ||  || — || September 19, 2006 || Catalina || CSS || H || align=right | 1.1 km || 
|-id=173 bgcolor=#E9E9E9
| 358173 ||  || — || September 18, 2006 || Kitt Peak || Spacewatch || — || align=right | 2.0 km || 
|-id=174 bgcolor=#E9E9E9
| 358174 ||  || — || September 20, 2006 || Črni Vrh || Črni Vrh || JUN || align=right | 1.6 km || 
|-id=175 bgcolor=#fefefe
| 358175 ||  || — || September 18, 2006 || Catalina || CSS || H || align=right data-sort-value="0.85" | 850 m || 
|-id=176 bgcolor=#E9E9E9
| 358176 ||  || — || September 19, 2006 || Kitt Peak || Spacewatch || MRX || align=right | 1.2 km || 
|-id=177 bgcolor=#E9E9E9
| 358177 ||  || — || September 19, 2006 || Kitt Peak || Spacewatch || — || align=right | 1.8 km || 
|-id=178 bgcolor=#E9E9E9
| 358178 ||  || — || September 19, 2006 || Catalina || CSS || — || align=right data-sort-value="0.98" | 980 m || 
|-id=179 bgcolor=#E9E9E9
| 358179 ||  || — || September 23, 2006 || Piszkéstető || K. Sárneczky, Z. Kuli || — || align=right | 2.4 km || 
|-id=180 bgcolor=#E9E9E9
| 358180 ||  || — || September 16, 2006 || Catalina || CSS || — || align=right | 2.3 km || 
|-id=181 bgcolor=#d6d6d6
| 358181 ||  || — || September 18, 2006 || Kitt Peak || Spacewatch || THM || align=right | 2.2 km || 
|-id=182 bgcolor=#E9E9E9
| 358182 ||  || — || September 18, 2006 || Kitt Peak || Spacewatch || — || align=right | 2.2 km || 
|-id=183 bgcolor=#E9E9E9
| 358183 ||  || — || September 18, 2006 || Kitt Peak || Spacewatch || AGN || align=right | 1.0 km || 
|-id=184 bgcolor=#d6d6d6
| 358184 ||  || — || September 18, 2006 || Kitt Peak || Spacewatch || — || align=right | 2.7 km || 
|-id=185 bgcolor=#E9E9E9
| 358185 ||  || — || September 18, 2006 || Kitt Peak || Spacewatch || — || align=right | 1.8 km || 
|-id=186 bgcolor=#E9E9E9
| 358186 ||  || — || September 18, 2006 || Kitt Peak || Spacewatch || HEN || align=right | 1.2 km || 
|-id=187 bgcolor=#d6d6d6
| 358187 ||  || — || September 18, 2006 || Kitt Peak || Spacewatch || — || align=right | 2.3 km || 
|-id=188 bgcolor=#E9E9E9
| 358188 ||  || — || September 18, 2006 || Kitt Peak || Spacewatch || — || align=right | 1.0 km || 
|-id=189 bgcolor=#E9E9E9
| 358189 ||  || — || September 18, 2006 || Kitt Peak || Spacewatch || — || align=right | 2.2 km || 
|-id=190 bgcolor=#E9E9E9
| 358190 ||  || — || September 18, 2006 || Kitt Peak || Spacewatch || — || align=right | 2.0 km || 
|-id=191 bgcolor=#E9E9E9
| 358191 ||  || — || September 18, 2006 || Kitt Peak || Spacewatch || PAD || align=right | 1.8 km || 
|-id=192 bgcolor=#E9E9E9
| 358192 ||  || — || September 19, 2006 || Kitt Peak || Spacewatch || — || align=right | 2.3 km || 
|-id=193 bgcolor=#E9E9E9
| 358193 ||  || — || September 19, 2006 || Kitt Peak || Spacewatch || NEM || align=right | 1.9 km || 
|-id=194 bgcolor=#E9E9E9
| 358194 ||  || — || September 19, 2006 || Kitt Peak || Spacewatch || HOF || align=right | 2.2 km || 
|-id=195 bgcolor=#E9E9E9
| 358195 ||  || — || September 19, 2006 || Kitt Peak || Spacewatch || — || align=right | 1.7 km || 
|-id=196 bgcolor=#E9E9E9
| 358196 ||  || — || September 23, 2006 || Kitt Peak || Spacewatch || NEM || align=right | 2.1 km || 
|-id=197 bgcolor=#E9E9E9
| 358197 ||  || — || September 23, 2006 || Kitt Peak || Spacewatch || — || align=right | 1.4 km || 
|-id=198 bgcolor=#E9E9E9
| 358198 ||  || — || September 16, 2006 || Anderson Mesa || LONEOS || JUN || align=right | 1.2 km || 
|-id=199 bgcolor=#E9E9E9
| 358199 ||  || — || September 21, 2006 || Anderson Mesa || LONEOS || — || align=right | 3.5 km || 
|-id=200 bgcolor=#E9E9E9
| 358200 ||  || — || September 19, 2006 || Catalina || CSS || — || align=right data-sort-value="0.98" | 980 m || 
|}

358201–358300 

|-bgcolor=#E9E9E9
| 358201 ||  || — || September 20, 2006 || Catalina || CSS || — || align=right | 2.8 km || 
|-id=202 bgcolor=#E9E9E9
| 358202 ||  || — || September 23, 2006 || Kitt Peak || Spacewatch || — || align=right | 1.4 km || 
|-id=203 bgcolor=#E9E9E9
| 358203 ||  || — || September 23, 2006 || Kitt Peak || Spacewatch || — || align=right | 1.6 km || 
|-id=204 bgcolor=#E9E9E9
| 358204 ||  || — || September 25, 2006 || Kitt Peak || Spacewatch || — || align=right | 2.2 km || 
|-id=205 bgcolor=#E9E9E9
| 358205 ||  || — || September 25, 2006 || Kitt Peak || Spacewatch || WIT || align=right | 1.2 km || 
|-id=206 bgcolor=#E9E9E9
| 358206 ||  || — || September 25, 2006 || Mount Lemmon || Mount Lemmon Survey || — || align=right | 1.6 km || 
|-id=207 bgcolor=#E9E9E9
| 358207 ||  || — || September 26, 2006 || Kitt Peak || Spacewatch || — || align=right | 1.9 km || 
|-id=208 bgcolor=#E9E9E9
| 358208 ||  || — || September 26, 2006 || Kitt Peak || Spacewatch || — || align=right | 1.1 km || 
|-id=209 bgcolor=#E9E9E9
| 358209 ||  || — || September 26, 2006 || Kitt Peak || Spacewatch || — || align=right | 1.5 km || 
|-id=210 bgcolor=#E9E9E9
| 358210 ||  || — || September 26, 2006 || Mount Lemmon || Mount Lemmon Survey || — || align=right | 2.0 km || 
|-id=211 bgcolor=#E9E9E9
| 358211 ||  || — || September 24, 2006 || Kitt Peak || Spacewatch || — || align=right | 1.0 km || 
|-id=212 bgcolor=#E9E9E9
| 358212 ||  || — || September 24, 2006 || Kitt Peak || Spacewatch || — || align=right | 1.6 km || 
|-id=213 bgcolor=#E9E9E9
| 358213 ||  || — || September 25, 2006 || Mount Lemmon || Mount Lemmon Survey || EUN || align=right | 1.2 km || 
|-id=214 bgcolor=#E9E9E9
| 358214 ||  || — || September 25, 2006 || Kitt Peak || Spacewatch || — || align=right | 1.6 km || 
|-id=215 bgcolor=#E9E9E9
| 358215 ||  || — || September 26, 2006 || Socorro || LINEAR || — || align=right | 2.0 km || 
|-id=216 bgcolor=#E9E9E9
| 358216 ||  || — || September 26, 2006 || Catalina || CSS || — || align=right | 2.5 km || 
|-id=217 bgcolor=#d6d6d6
| 358217 ||  || — || September 16, 2006 || Catalina || CSS || — || align=right | 4.2 km || 
|-id=218 bgcolor=#E9E9E9
| 358218 ||  || — || September 26, 2006 || Kitt Peak || Spacewatch || — || align=right data-sort-value="0.91" | 910 m || 
|-id=219 bgcolor=#E9E9E9
| 358219 ||  || — || September 26, 2006 || Kitt Peak || Spacewatch || WIT || align=right | 1.0 km || 
|-id=220 bgcolor=#E9E9E9
| 358220 ||  || — || September 26, 2006 || Kitt Peak || Spacewatch || AGN || align=right | 1.2 km || 
|-id=221 bgcolor=#E9E9E9
| 358221 ||  || — || September 17, 2006 || Catalina || CSS || NEM || align=right | 2.1 km || 
|-id=222 bgcolor=#d6d6d6
| 358222 ||  || — || September 18, 2006 || Kitt Peak || Spacewatch || — || align=right | 2.1 km || 
|-id=223 bgcolor=#E9E9E9
| 358223 ||  || — || September 26, 2006 || Kitt Peak || Spacewatch || — || align=right | 2.3 km || 
|-id=224 bgcolor=#E9E9E9
| 358224 ||  || — || September 26, 2006 || Kitt Peak || Spacewatch || — || align=right | 2.9 km || 
|-id=225 bgcolor=#E9E9E9
| 358225 ||  || — || September 26, 2006 || Catalina || CSS || — || align=right | 2.2 km || 
|-id=226 bgcolor=#d6d6d6
| 358226 ||  || — || September 26, 2006 || Kitt Peak || Spacewatch || 627 || align=right | 2.3 km || 
|-id=227 bgcolor=#E9E9E9
| 358227 ||  || — || September 26, 2006 || Kitt Peak || Spacewatch || — || align=right | 2.5 km || 
|-id=228 bgcolor=#E9E9E9
| 358228 ||  || — || September 26, 2006 || Mount Lemmon || Mount Lemmon Survey || — || align=right | 2.4 km || 
|-id=229 bgcolor=#d6d6d6
| 358229 ||  || — || September 26, 2006 || Kitt Peak || Spacewatch || — || align=right | 2.3 km || 
|-id=230 bgcolor=#E9E9E9
| 358230 ||  || — || September 28, 2006 || Kitt Peak || Spacewatch || — || align=right | 1.9 km || 
|-id=231 bgcolor=#d6d6d6
| 358231 ||  || — || September 18, 2006 || Calvin-Rehoboth || L. A. Molnar || — || align=right | 2.0 km || 
|-id=232 bgcolor=#E9E9E9
| 358232 ||  || — || September 25, 2006 || Kitt Peak || Spacewatch || AGN || align=right | 1.1 km || 
|-id=233 bgcolor=#E9E9E9
| 358233 ||  || — || September 27, 2006 || Kitt Peak || Spacewatch || WIT || align=right | 1.2 km || 
|-id=234 bgcolor=#E9E9E9
| 358234 ||  || — || September 27, 2006 || Kitt Peak || Spacewatch || — || align=right | 1.6 km || 
|-id=235 bgcolor=#E9E9E9
| 358235 ||  || — || September 27, 2006 || Kitt Peak || Spacewatch || — || align=right | 1.7 km || 
|-id=236 bgcolor=#E9E9E9
| 358236 ||  || — || September 28, 2006 || Mount Lemmon || Mount Lemmon Survey || INO || align=right | 1.6 km || 
|-id=237 bgcolor=#E9E9E9
| 358237 ||  || — || September 28, 2006 || Kitt Peak || Spacewatch || HEN || align=right data-sort-value="0.97" | 970 m || 
|-id=238 bgcolor=#E9E9E9
| 358238 ||  || — || September 28, 2006 || Kitt Peak || Spacewatch || — || align=right | 2.1 km || 
|-id=239 bgcolor=#E9E9E9
| 358239 ||  || — || September 28, 2006 || Kitt Peak || Spacewatch || — || align=right | 2.4 km || 
|-id=240 bgcolor=#E9E9E9
| 358240 ||  || — || September 28, 2006 || Kitt Peak || Spacewatch || NEM || align=right | 2.7 km || 
|-id=241 bgcolor=#E9E9E9
| 358241 ||  || — || September 28, 2006 || Kitt Peak || Spacewatch || AGN || align=right data-sort-value="0.95" | 950 m || 
|-id=242 bgcolor=#E9E9E9
| 358242 ||  || — || September 28, 2006 || Kitt Peak || Spacewatch || — || align=right | 1.7 km || 
|-id=243 bgcolor=#E9E9E9
| 358243 ||  || — || March 21, 1999 || Apache Point || SDSS || MRX || align=right | 1.2 km || 
|-id=244 bgcolor=#E9E9E9
| 358244 ||  || — || September 30, 2006 || Mount Lemmon || Mount Lemmon Survey || — || align=right | 2.6 km || 
|-id=245 bgcolor=#E9E9E9
| 358245 ||  || — || September 30, 2006 || Mount Lemmon || Mount Lemmon Survey || HEN || align=right | 1.2 km || 
|-id=246 bgcolor=#E9E9E9
| 358246 ||  || — || September 22, 2006 || Apache Point || A. C. Becker || WIT || align=right data-sort-value="0.91" | 910 m || 
|-id=247 bgcolor=#E9E9E9
| 358247 ||  || — || September 27, 2006 || Mount Lemmon || Mount Lemmon Survey || HOF || align=right | 2.3 km || 
|-id=248 bgcolor=#fefefe
| 358248 ||  || — || September 19, 2006 || Kitt Peak || Spacewatch || H || align=right data-sort-value="0.83" | 830 m || 
|-id=249 bgcolor=#E9E9E9
| 358249 ||  || — || October 2, 2006 || Mount Lemmon || Mount Lemmon Survey || RAF || align=right | 1.6 km || 
|-id=250 bgcolor=#E9E9E9
| 358250 ||  || — || October 11, 2006 || Kitt Peak || Spacewatch || — || align=right | 1.8 km || 
|-id=251 bgcolor=#E9E9E9
| 358251 ||  || — || October 11, 2006 || Kitt Peak || Spacewatch || — || align=right | 2.4 km || 
|-id=252 bgcolor=#fefefe
| 358252 ||  || — || October 12, 2006 || Palomar || NEAT || H || align=right data-sort-value="0.71" | 710 m || 
|-id=253 bgcolor=#E9E9E9
| 358253 ||  || — || October 12, 2006 || Kitt Peak || Spacewatch || — || align=right | 3.2 km || 
|-id=254 bgcolor=#E9E9E9
| 358254 ||  || — || October 12, 2006 || Kitt Peak || Spacewatch || — || align=right | 2.1 km || 
|-id=255 bgcolor=#d6d6d6
| 358255 ||  || — || October 4, 2006 || Mount Lemmon || Mount Lemmon Survey || — || align=right | 2.0 km || 
|-id=256 bgcolor=#E9E9E9
| 358256 ||  || — || October 12, 2006 || Kitt Peak || Spacewatch || PAD || align=right | 1.8 km || 
|-id=257 bgcolor=#E9E9E9
| 358257 ||  || — || October 12, 2006 || Kitt Peak || Spacewatch || AGN || align=right | 1.2 km || 
|-id=258 bgcolor=#d6d6d6
| 358258 ||  || — || October 12, 2006 || Kitt Peak || Spacewatch || — || align=right | 5.4 km || 
|-id=259 bgcolor=#E9E9E9
| 358259 ||  || — || October 12, 2006 || Kitt Peak || Spacewatch || HOF || align=right | 2.7 km || 
|-id=260 bgcolor=#E9E9E9
| 358260 ||  || — || October 12, 2006 || Kitt Peak || Spacewatch || — || align=right | 2.3 km || 
|-id=261 bgcolor=#d6d6d6
| 358261 ||  || — || October 12, 2006 || Kitt Peak || Spacewatch || KOR || align=right | 1.3 km || 
|-id=262 bgcolor=#E9E9E9
| 358262 ||  || — || October 12, 2006 || Kitt Peak || Spacewatch || — || align=right | 1.9 km || 
|-id=263 bgcolor=#E9E9E9
| 358263 ||  || — || October 15, 2006 || Bergisch Gladbach || W. Bickel || — || align=right | 2.4 km || 
|-id=264 bgcolor=#E9E9E9
| 358264 ||  || — || October 11, 2006 || Palomar || NEAT || — || align=right | 2.8 km || 
|-id=265 bgcolor=#E9E9E9
| 358265 ||  || — || October 13, 2006 || Kitt Peak || Spacewatch || MAR || align=right | 1.4 km || 
|-id=266 bgcolor=#E9E9E9
| 358266 ||  || — || September 27, 2006 || Mount Lemmon || Mount Lemmon Survey || MAR || align=right | 1.4 km || 
|-id=267 bgcolor=#E9E9E9
| 358267 ||  || — || October 15, 2006 || Kitt Peak || Spacewatch || — || align=right | 1.8 km || 
|-id=268 bgcolor=#E9E9E9
| 358268 ||  || — || October 15, 2006 || Catalina || CSS || — || align=right | 2.7 km || 
|-id=269 bgcolor=#E9E9E9
| 358269 ||  || — || October 4, 2006 || Mount Lemmon || Mount Lemmon Survey || — || align=right | 2.7 km || 
|-id=270 bgcolor=#E9E9E9
| 358270 ||  || — || October 1, 2006 || Apache Point || A. C. Becker || HOF || align=right | 2.3 km || 
|-id=271 bgcolor=#E9E9E9
| 358271 ||  || — || October 12, 2006 || Apache Point || A. C. Becker || WIT || align=right data-sort-value="0.75" | 750 m || 
|-id=272 bgcolor=#d6d6d6
| 358272 ||  || — || October 12, 2006 || Apache Point || A. C. Becker || — || align=right | 2.6 km || 
|-id=273 bgcolor=#d6d6d6
| 358273 ||  || — || October 2, 2006 || Mount Lemmon || Mount Lemmon Survey || — || align=right | 2.5 km || 
|-id=274 bgcolor=#E9E9E9
| 358274 ||  || — || October 18, 2006 || Piszkéstető || K. Sárneczky || AGN || align=right | 1.1 km || 
|-id=275 bgcolor=#E9E9E9
| 358275 ||  || — || October 17, 2006 || Mount Lemmon || Mount Lemmon Survey || — || align=right | 3.0 km || 
|-id=276 bgcolor=#E9E9E9
| 358276 ||  || — || October 16, 2006 || Junk Bond || D. Healy || — || align=right | 2.0 km || 
|-id=277 bgcolor=#E9E9E9
| 358277 ||  || — || October 16, 2006 || Kitt Peak || Spacewatch || — || align=right | 2.1 km || 
|-id=278 bgcolor=#E9E9E9
| 358278 ||  || — || October 16, 2006 || Kitt Peak || Spacewatch || HEN || align=right | 1.0 km || 
|-id=279 bgcolor=#E9E9E9
| 358279 ||  || — || October 16, 2006 || Kitt Peak || Spacewatch || — || align=right | 2.3 km || 
|-id=280 bgcolor=#d6d6d6
| 358280 ||  || — || October 16, 2006 || Kitt Peak || Spacewatch || K-2 || align=right | 1.5 km || 
|-id=281 bgcolor=#E9E9E9
| 358281 ||  || — || October 16, 2006 || Kitt Peak || Spacewatch || MRX || align=right | 1.3 km || 
|-id=282 bgcolor=#E9E9E9
| 358282 ||  || — || October 16, 2006 || Kitt Peak || Spacewatch || HEN || align=right | 1.2 km || 
|-id=283 bgcolor=#E9E9E9
| 358283 ||  || — || October 16, 2006 || Kitt Peak || Spacewatch || — || align=right | 2.0 km || 
|-id=284 bgcolor=#E9E9E9
| 358284 ||  || — || October 16, 2006 || Kitt Peak || Spacewatch || — || align=right | 2.9 km || 
|-id=285 bgcolor=#d6d6d6
| 358285 ||  || — || October 16, 2006 || Kitt Peak || Spacewatch || KAR || align=right | 1.0 km || 
|-id=286 bgcolor=#E9E9E9
| 358286 ||  || — || October 17, 2006 || Kitt Peak || Spacewatch || WIT || align=right | 1.1 km || 
|-id=287 bgcolor=#E9E9E9
| 358287 ||  || — || October 19, 2006 || Kitt Peak || Spacewatch || — || align=right | 2.0 km || 
|-id=288 bgcolor=#E9E9E9
| 358288 ||  || — || October 16, 2006 || Catalina || CSS || — || align=right | 2.0 km || 
|-id=289 bgcolor=#E9E9E9
| 358289 ||  || — || October 16, 2006 || Bergisch Gladbac || W. Bickel || — || align=right | 2.2 km || 
|-id=290 bgcolor=#E9E9E9
| 358290 ||  || — || October 17, 2006 || Mount Lemmon || Mount Lemmon Survey || — || align=right | 2.7 km || 
|-id=291 bgcolor=#E9E9E9
| 358291 ||  || — || October 17, 2006 || Kitt Peak || Spacewatch || — || align=right | 2.2 km || 
|-id=292 bgcolor=#E9E9E9
| 358292 ||  || — || October 18, 2006 || Kitt Peak || Spacewatch || NEM || align=right | 2.5 km || 
|-id=293 bgcolor=#d6d6d6
| 358293 ||  || — || October 18, 2006 || Kitt Peak || Spacewatch || — || align=right | 2.0 km || 
|-id=294 bgcolor=#E9E9E9
| 358294 ||  || — || October 18, 2006 || Kitt Peak || Spacewatch || WIT || align=right | 1.1 km || 
|-id=295 bgcolor=#E9E9E9
| 358295 ||  || — || October 18, 2006 || Kitt Peak || Spacewatch || — || align=right | 1.8 km || 
|-id=296 bgcolor=#E9E9E9
| 358296 ||  || — || October 18, 2006 || Kitt Peak || Spacewatch || WIT || align=right | 1.0 km || 
|-id=297 bgcolor=#E9E9E9
| 358297 ||  || — || October 19, 2006 || Kitt Peak || Spacewatch || — || align=right | 3.4 km || 
|-id=298 bgcolor=#E9E9E9
| 358298 ||  || — || October 19, 2006 || Kitt Peak || Spacewatch || — || align=right | 2.1 km || 
|-id=299 bgcolor=#E9E9E9
| 358299 ||  || — || October 19, 2006 || Kitt Peak || Spacewatch || HOF || align=right | 2.3 km || 
|-id=300 bgcolor=#E9E9E9
| 358300 ||  || — || October 19, 2006 || Kitt Peak || Spacewatch || — || align=right | 3.7 km || 
|}

358301–358400 

|-bgcolor=#E9E9E9
| 358301 ||  || — || October 20, 2006 || Mount Lemmon || Mount Lemmon Survey || — || align=right | 2.4 km || 
|-id=302 bgcolor=#E9E9E9
| 358302 ||  || — || October 21, 2006 || Mount Lemmon || Mount Lemmon Survey || — || align=right | 2.6 km || 
|-id=303 bgcolor=#E9E9E9
| 358303 ||  || — || October 21, 2006 || Mount Lemmon || Mount Lemmon Survey || — || align=right | 2.3 km || 
|-id=304 bgcolor=#E9E9E9
| 358304 ||  || — || October 21, 2006 || Mount Lemmon || Mount Lemmon Survey || — || align=right | 2.0 km || 
|-id=305 bgcolor=#d6d6d6
| 358305 ||  || — || October 21, 2006 || Mount Lemmon || Mount Lemmon Survey || — || align=right | 5.2 km || 
|-id=306 bgcolor=#E9E9E9
| 358306 ||  || — || October 17, 2006 || Catalina || CSS || GEF || align=right | 1.3 km || 
|-id=307 bgcolor=#E9E9E9
| 358307 ||  || — || January 15, 1999 || Kitt Peak || Spacewatch || PAD || align=right | 2.3 km || 
|-id=308 bgcolor=#E9E9E9
| 358308 ||  || — || October 20, 2006 || Palomar || NEAT || AEO || align=right | 1.3 km || 
|-id=309 bgcolor=#d6d6d6
| 358309 ||  || — || September 28, 2006 || Mount Lemmon || Mount Lemmon Survey || — || align=right | 3.1 km || 
|-id=310 bgcolor=#d6d6d6
| 358310 ||  || — || October 23, 2006 || Mount Lemmon || Mount Lemmon Survey || — || align=right | 2.3 km || 
|-id=311 bgcolor=#d6d6d6
| 358311 ||  || — || October 20, 2006 || Socorro || LINEAR || — || align=right | 4.6 km || 
|-id=312 bgcolor=#d6d6d6
| 358312 ||  || — || October 27, 2006 || Kitt Peak || Spacewatch || THM || align=right | 2.1 km || 
|-id=313 bgcolor=#d6d6d6
| 358313 ||  || — || October 27, 2006 || Mount Lemmon || Mount Lemmon Survey || KOR || align=right | 1.2 km || 
|-id=314 bgcolor=#d6d6d6
| 358314 ||  || — || October 16, 2006 || Kitt Peak || Spacewatch || — || align=right | 1.9 km || 
|-id=315 bgcolor=#d6d6d6
| 358315 ||  || — || October 27, 2006 || Mount Lemmon || Mount Lemmon Survey || — || align=right | 3.8 km || 
|-id=316 bgcolor=#E9E9E9
| 358316 ||  || — || October 27, 2006 || Kitt Peak || Spacewatch || — || align=right | 2.5 km || 
|-id=317 bgcolor=#E9E9E9
| 358317 ||  || — || October 28, 2006 || Kitt Peak || Spacewatch || AGN || align=right | 1.3 km || 
|-id=318 bgcolor=#E9E9E9
| 358318 ||  || — || October 31, 2006 || Mount Lemmon || Mount Lemmon Survey || — || align=right | 1.7 km || 
|-id=319 bgcolor=#d6d6d6
| 358319 ||  || — || October 31, 2006 || Kitt Peak || Spacewatch || CHA || align=right | 2.1 km || 
|-id=320 bgcolor=#d6d6d6
| 358320 ||  || — || October 31, 2006 || Mount Lemmon || Mount Lemmon Survey || — || align=right | 2.4 km || 
|-id=321 bgcolor=#d6d6d6
| 358321 ||  || — || October 16, 2006 || Kitt Peak || Spacewatch || K-2 || align=right | 1.1 km || 
|-id=322 bgcolor=#d6d6d6
| 358322 ||  || — || October 27, 2006 || Mount Lemmon || Mount Lemmon Survey || — || align=right | 3.6 km || 
|-id=323 bgcolor=#d6d6d6
| 358323 ||  || — || October 16, 2006 || Catalina || CSS || — || align=right | 3.1 km || 
|-id=324 bgcolor=#d6d6d6
| 358324 ||  || — || November 10, 2006 || Kitt Peak || Spacewatch || — || align=right | 2.8 km || 
|-id=325 bgcolor=#E9E9E9
| 358325 ||  || — || November 9, 2006 || Kitt Peak || Spacewatch || — || align=right | 2.3 km || 
|-id=326 bgcolor=#d6d6d6
| 358326 ||  || — || November 9, 2006 || Kitt Peak || Spacewatch || — || align=right | 2.4 km || 
|-id=327 bgcolor=#d6d6d6
| 358327 ||  || — || November 10, 2006 || Kitt Peak || Spacewatch || — || align=right | 1.7 km || 
|-id=328 bgcolor=#d6d6d6
| 358328 ||  || — || November 10, 2006 || Kitt Peak || Spacewatch || — || align=right | 3.0 km || 
|-id=329 bgcolor=#d6d6d6
| 358329 ||  || — || November 14, 2006 || Kitt Peak || Spacewatch || — || align=right | 2.3 km || 
|-id=330 bgcolor=#d6d6d6
| 358330 ||  || — || September 28, 2006 || Mount Lemmon || Mount Lemmon Survey || — || align=right | 2.3 km || 
|-id=331 bgcolor=#d6d6d6
| 358331 ||  || — || November 11, 2006 || Kitt Peak || Spacewatch || — || align=right | 2.6 km || 
|-id=332 bgcolor=#E9E9E9
| 358332 ||  || — || November 11, 2006 || Kitt Peak || Spacewatch || — || align=right | 2.0 km || 
|-id=333 bgcolor=#d6d6d6
| 358333 ||  || — || November 11, 2006 || Kitt Peak || Spacewatch || THM || align=right | 2.1 km || 
|-id=334 bgcolor=#d6d6d6
| 358334 ||  || — || November 11, 2006 || Kitt Peak || Spacewatch || — || align=right | 4.9 km || 
|-id=335 bgcolor=#E9E9E9
| 358335 ||  || — || November 12, 2006 || Mount Lemmon || Mount Lemmon Survey || — || align=right | 2.7 km || 
|-id=336 bgcolor=#E9E9E9
| 358336 ||  || — || November 12, 2006 || Mount Lemmon || Mount Lemmon Survey || — || align=right | 2.5 km || 
|-id=337 bgcolor=#d6d6d6
| 358337 ||  || — || October 31, 2006 || Mount Lemmon || Mount Lemmon Survey || — || align=right | 3.5 km || 
|-id=338 bgcolor=#d6d6d6
| 358338 ||  || — || November 14, 2006 || Mount Lemmon || Mount Lemmon Survey || — || align=right | 2.9 km || 
|-id=339 bgcolor=#d6d6d6
| 358339 ||  || — || November 12, 2006 || Lulin Observatory || H.-C. Lin, Q.-z. Ye || — || align=right | 2.3 km || 
|-id=340 bgcolor=#E9E9E9
| 358340 ||  || — || November 13, 2006 || Mount Lemmon || Mount Lemmon Survey || — || align=right | 1.8 km || 
|-id=341 bgcolor=#E9E9E9
| 358341 ||  || — || November 13, 2006 || Palomar || NEAT || — || align=right | 1.4 km || 
|-id=342 bgcolor=#E9E9E9
| 358342 ||  || — || November 14, 2006 || Mount Lemmon || Mount Lemmon Survey || — || align=right | 1.8 km || 
|-id=343 bgcolor=#d6d6d6
| 358343 ||  || — || November 15, 2006 || Kitt Peak || Spacewatch || — || align=right | 2.7 km || 
|-id=344 bgcolor=#d6d6d6
| 358344 ||  || — || November 15, 2006 || Catalina || CSS || — || align=right | 2.8 km || 
|-id=345 bgcolor=#E9E9E9
| 358345 ||  || — || November 16, 2006 || Mount Lemmon || Mount Lemmon Survey || — || align=right | 4.7 km || 
|-id=346 bgcolor=#d6d6d6
| 358346 ||  || — || October 2, 2006 || Mount Lemmon || Mount Lemmon Survey || — || align=right | 2.5 km || 
|-id=347 bgcolor=#d6d6d6
| 358347 ||  || — || November 16, 2006 || Kitt Peak || Spacewatch || THM || align=right | 1.7 km || 
|-id=348 bgcolor=#E9E9E9
| 358348 ||  || — || November 16, 2006 || Kitt Peak || Spacewatch || — || align=right | 2.3 km || 
|-id=349 bgcolor=#E9E9E9
| 358349 ||  || — || November 17, 2006 || Catalina || CSS || WIT || align=right | 1.2 km || 
|-id=350 bgcolor=#d6d6d6
| 358350 ||  || — || October 17, 2006 || Mount Lemmon || Mount Lemmon Survey || — || align=right | 3.4 km || 
|-id=351 bgcolor=#d6d6d6
| 358351 ||  || — || November 19, 2006 || Kitt Peak || Spacewatch || KOR || align=right | 1.3 km || 
|-id=352 bgcolor=#d6d6d6
| 358352 ||  || — || November 19, 2006 || Kitt Peak || Spacewatch || — || align=right | 2.2 km || 
|-id=353 bgcolor=#d6d6d6
| 358353 ||  || — || November 19, 2006 || Kitt Peak || Spacewatch || — || align=right | 2.2 km || 
|-id=354 bgcolor=#d6d6d6
| 358354 ||  || — || November 19, 2006 || Kitt Peak || Spacewatch || KAR || align=right | 1.2 km || 
|-id=355 bgcolor=#d6d6d6
| 358355 ||  || — || November 11, 2006 || Kitt Peak || Spacewatch || — || align=right | 2.0 km || 
|-id=356 bgcolor=#E9E9E9
| 358356 ||  || — || October 27, 2006 || Kitt Peak || Spacewatch || AGN || align=right | 1.2 km || 
|-id=357 bgcolor=#d6d6d6
| 358357 ||  || — || November 21, 2006 || Mount Lemmon || Mount Lemmon Survey || — || align=right | 2.9 km || 
|-id=358 bgcolor=#d6d6d6
| 358358 ||  || — || November 20, 2006 || Kitt Peak || Spacewatch || KOR || align=right | 1.4 km || 
|-id=359 bgcolor=#E9E9E9
| 358359 ||  || — || November 23, 2006 || Mount Lemmon || Mount Lemmon Survey || WIT || align=right | 1.0 km || 
|-id=360 bgcolor=#d6d6d6
| 358360 ||  || — || October 31, 2006 || Mount Lemmon || Mount Lemmon Survey || — || align=right | 2.4 km || 
|-id=361 bgcolor=#d6d6d6
| 358361 ||  || — || November 11, 2006 || Kitt Peak || Spacewatch || — || align=right | 3.9 km || 
|-id=362 bgcolor=#d6d6d6
| 358362 ||  || — || November 25, 2006 || Mount Lemmon || Mount Lemmon Survey || — || align=right | 3.5 km || 
|-id=363 bgcolor=#d6d6d6
| 358363 ||  || — || October 28, 2006 || Mount Lemmon || Mount Lemmon Survey || — || align=right | 1.9 km || 
|-id=364 bgcolor=#d6d6d6
| 358364 ||  || — || November 19, 2006 || Kitt Peak || Spacewatch || — || align=right | 1.9 km || 
|-id=365 bgcolor=#fefefe
| 358365 ||  || — || November 20, 2006 || Catalina || CSS || — || align=right data-sort-value="0.89" | 890 m || 
|-id=366 bgcolor=#d6d6d6
| 358366 ||  || — || November 24, 2006 || Mount Lemmon || Mount Lemmon Survey || — || align=right | 4.4 km || 
|-id=367 bgcolor=#d6d6d6
| 358367 ||  || — || December 9, 2006 || Palomar || NEAT || — || align=right | 3.5 km || 
|-id=368 bgcolor=#d6d6d6
| 358368 ||  || — || December 9, 2006 || Kitt Peak || Spacewatch || — || align=right | 2.3 km || 
|-id=369 bgcolor=#d6d6d6
| 358369 ||  || — || December 10, 2006 || Kitt Peak || Spacewatch || — || align=right | 3.7 km || 
|-id=370 bgcolor=#d6d6d6
| 358370 ||  || — || December 11, 2006 || Kitt Peak || Spacewatch || — || align=right | 3.7 km || 
|-id=371 bgcolor=#d6d6d6
| 358371 ||  || — || October 22, 2006 || Mount Lemmon || Mount Lemmon Survey || LIX || align=right | 3.4 km || 
|-id=372 bgcolor=#fefefe
| 358372 ||  || — || December 12, 2006 || Catalina || CSS || H || align=right | 1.1 km || 
|-id=373 bgcolor=#d6d6d6
| 358373 ||  || — || December 1, 2006 || Kitt Peak || Spacewatch || — || align=right | 2.4 km || 
|-id=374 bgcolor=#fefefe
| 358374 ||  || — || December 11, 2006 || Kitt Peak || Spacewatch || — || align=right data-sort-value="0.89" | 890 m || 
|-id=375 bgcolor=#d6d6d6
| 358375 ||  || — || December 11, 2006 || Kitt Peak || Spacewatch || — || align=right | 5.0 km || 
|-id=376 bgcolor=#d6d6d6
| 358376 Gwyn ||  ||  || December 13, 2006 || Mauna Kea || D. D. Balam || — || align=right | 4.3 km || 
|-id=377 bgcolor=#d6d6d6
| 358377 ||  || — || December 13, 2006 || Kitt Peak || Spacewatch || — || align=right | 2.9 km || 
|-id=378 bgcolor=#d6d6d6
| 358378 ||  || — || December 15, 2006 || Kitt Peak || Spacewatch || — || align=right | 3.7 km || 
|-id=379 bgcolor=#d6d6d6
| 358379 ||  || — || December 1, 2006 || Mount Lemmon || Mount Lemmon Survey || — || align=right | 4.7 km || 
|-id=380 bgcolor=#d6d6d6
| 358380 ||  || — || December 15, 2006 || Kitt Peak || Spacewatch || — || align=right | 2.9 km || 
|-id=381 bgcolor=#d6d6d6
| 358381 ||  || — || December 15, 2006 || Kitt Peak || Spacewatch || — || align=right | 2.5 km || 
|-id=382 bgcolor=#d6d6d6
| 358382 ||  || — || November 27, 2006 || Mount Lemmon || Mount Lemmon Survey || — || align=right | 3.4 km || 
|-id=383 bgcolor=#d6d6d6
| 358383 ||  || — || December 24, 2006 || Bergisch Gladbac || W. Bickel || — || align=right | 3.1 km || 
|-id=384 bgcolor=#d6d6d6
| 358384 ||  || — || December 21, 2006 || Kitt Peak || Spacewatch || — || align=right | 2.7 km || 
|-id=385 bgcolor=#d6d6d6
| 358385 ||  || — || December 16, 2006 || Mount Lemmon || Mount Lemmon Survey || — || align=right | 3.3 km || 
|-id=386 bgcolor=#d6d6d6
| 358386 ||  || — || December 21, 2006 || Kitt Peak || Spacewatch || — || align=right | 2.1 km || 
|-id=387 bgcolor=#d6d6d6
| 358387 ||  || — || December 21, 2006 || Kitt Peak || Spacewatch || — || align=right | 2.6 km || 
|-id=388 bgcolor=#d6d6d6
| 358388 ||  || — || December 22, 2006 || Mount Lemmon || Mount Lemmon Survey || — || align=right | 3.8 km || 
|-id=389 bgcolor=#d6d6d6
| 358389 ||  || — || December 23, 2006 || Catalina || CSS || — || align=right | 3.6 km || 
|-id=390 bgcolor=#d6d6d6
| 358390 ||  || — || December 12, 2006 || Kitt Peak || Spacewatch || — || align=right | 2.2 km || 
|-id=391 bgcolor=#d6d6d6
| 358391 ||  || — || December 27, 2006 || Mount Lemmon || Mount Lemmon Survey || — || align=right | 2.3 km || 
|-id=392 bgcolor=#d6d6d6
| 358392 ||  || — || January 9, 2007 || Mount Lemmon || Mount Lemmon Survey || TEL || align=right | 1.7 km || 
|-id=393 bgcolor=#d6d6d6
| 358393 ||  || — || January 15, 2007 || Kitt Peak || Spacewatch || — || align=right | 2.9 km || 
|-id=394 bgcolor=#d6d6d6
| 358394 ||  || — || January 10, 2007 || Mount Lemmon || Mount Lemmon Survey || — || align=right | 4.3 km || 
|-id=395 bgcolor=#d6d6d6
| 358395 ||  || — || January 15, 2007 || Anderson Mesa || LONEOS || — || align=right | 3.3 km || 
|-id=396 bgcolor=#d6d6d6
| 358396 ||  || — || January 10, 2007 || Mount Lemmon || Mount Lemmon Survey || EOS || align=right | 1.9 km || 
|-id=397 bgcolor=#d6d6d6
| 358397 ||  || — || January 10, 2007 || Kitt Peak || Spacewatch || — || align=right | 4.0 km || 
|-id=398 bgcolor=#d6d6d6
| 358398 ||  || — || January 17, 2007 || Palomar || NEAT || — || align=right | 4.8 km || 
|-id=399 bgcolor=#d6d6d6
| 358399 ||  || — || January 17, 2007 || Palomar || NEAT || THB || align=right | 4.3 km || 
|-id=400 bgcolor=#d6d6d6
| 358400 ||  || — || January 24, 2007 || Socorro || LINEAR || EOS || align=right | 2.3 km || 
|}

358401–358500 

|-bgcolor=#d6d6d6
| 358401 ||  || — || January 24, 2007 || Mount Lemmon || Mount Lemmon Survey || — || align=right | 3.5 km || 
|-id=402 bgcolor=#d6d6d6
| 358402 ||  || — || January 24, 2007 || Mount Lemmon || Mount Lemmon Survey || EOS || align=right | 2.1 km || 
|-id=403 bgcolor=#d6d6d6
| 358403 ||  || — || January 24, 2007 || Mount Lemmon || Mount Lemmon Survey || THM || align=right | 1.8 km || 
|-id=404 bgcolor=#d6d6d6
| 358404 ||  || — || January 24, 2007 || Catalina || CSS || — || align=right | 4.3 km || 
|-id=405 bgcolor=#d6d6d6
| 358405 ||  || — || January 24, 2007 || Kitt Peak || Spacewatch || EOS || align=right | 1.7 km || 
|-id=406 bgcolor=#d6d6d6
| 358406 ||  || — || January 24, 2007 || Catalina || CSS || — || align=right | 3.5 km || 
|-id=407 bgcolor=#d6d6d6
| 358407 ||  || — || January 28, 2007 || Mount Lemmon || Mount Lemmon Survey || EOS || align=right | 2.4 km || 
|-id=408 bgcolor=#d6d6d6
| 358408 ||  || — || January 26, 2007 || Kitt Peak || Spacewatch || — || align=right | 4.0 km || 
|-id=409 bgcolor=#d6d6d6
| 358409 ||  || — || February 6, 2007 || Kitt Peak || Spacewatch || — || align=right | 4.7 km || 
|-id=410 bgcolor=#d6d6d6
| 358410 ||  || — || February 7, 2007 || Catalina || CSS || EUP || align=right | 3.7 km || 
|-id=411 bgcolor=#d6d6d6
| 358411 ||  || — || December 13, 2006 || Mount Lemmon || Mount Lemmon Survey || — || align=right | 3.5 km || 
|-id=412 bgcolor=#d6d6d6
| 358412 ||  || — || February 6, 2007 || Kitt Peak || Spacewatch || — || align=right | 4.9 km || 
|-id=413 bgcolor=#d6d6d6
| 358413 ||  || — || February 7, 2007 || Kitt Peak || Spacewatch || HYG || align=right | 3.0 km || 
|-id=414 bgcolor=#d6d6d6
| 358414 ||  || — || February 6, 2007 || Mount Lemmon || Mount Lemmon Survey || VER || align=right | 3.6 km || 
|-id=415 bgcolor=#d6d6d6
| 358415 ||  || — || February 8, 2007 || Kitt Peak || Spacewatch || EOS || align=right | 1.9 km || 
|-id=416 bgcolor=#d6d6d6
| 358416 ||  || — || February 8, 2007 || Mount Lemmon || Mount Lemmon Survey || EOS || align=right | 2.5 km || 
|-id=417 bgcolor=#d6d6d6
| 358417 ||  || — || February 8, 2007 || Kitt Peak || Spacewatch || THB || align=right | 3.5 km || 
|-id=418 bgcolor=#d6d6d6
| 358418 ||  || — || February 6, 2007 || Mount Lemmon || Mount Lemmon Survey || — || align=right | 4.5 km || 
|-id=419 bgcolor=#d6d6d6
| 358419 ||  || — || February 6, 2007 || Mount Lemmon || Mount Lemmon Survey || — || align=right | 3.0 km || 
|-id=420 bgcolor=#d6d6d6
| 358420 ||  || — || February 8, 2007 || Kitt Peak || Spacewatch || EOS || align=right | 2.3 km || 
|-id=421 bgcolor=#d6d6d6
| 358421 ||  || — || February 15, 2007 || Palomar || NEAT || LIX || align=right | 5.4 km || 
|-id=422 bgcolor=#d6d6d6
| 358422 ||  || — || February 10, 2007 || Catalina || CSS || — || align=right | 5.3 km || 
|-id=423 bgcolor=#d6d6d6
| 358423 ||  || — || February 15, 2007 || Palomar || NEAT || — || align=right | 4.5 km || 
|-id=424 bgcolor=#d6d6d6
| 358424 ||  || — || February 15, 2007 || Catalina || CSS || — || align=right | 4.7 km || 
|-id=425 bgcolor=#d6d6d6
| 358425 ||  || — || February 17, 2007 || Kitt Peak || Spacewatch || — || align=right | 2.9 km || 
|-id=426 bgcolor=#d6d6d6
| 358426 ||  || — || February 21, 2007 || Eskridge || G. Hug || fast? || align=right | 4.5 km || 
|-id=427 bgcolor=#d6d6d6
| 358427 ||  || — || February 17, 2007 || Kitt Peak || Spacewatch || — || align=right | 3.4 km || 
|-id=428 bgcolor=#d6d6d6
| 358428 ||  || — || February 8, 2007 || Kitt Peak || Spacewatch || — || align=right | 3.2 km || 
|-id=429 bgcolor=#d6d6d6
| 358429 ||  || — || October 7, 2004 || Kitt Peak || Spacewatch || VER || align=right | 2.8 km || 
|-id=430 bgcolor=#d6d6d6
| 358430 ||  || — || February 17, 2007 || Kitt Peak || Spacewatch || — || align=right | 3.5 km || 
|-id=431 bgcolor=#d6d6d6
| 358431 ||  || — || February 17, 2007 || Kitt Peak || Spacewatch || — || align=right | 3.2 km || 
|-id=432 bgcolor=#d6d6d6
| 358432 ||  || — || February 17, 2007 || Kitt Peak || Spacewatch || EOS || align=right | 1.9 km || 
|-id=433 bgcolor=#d6d6d6
| 358433 ||  || — || February 17, 2007 || Kitt Peak || Spacewatch || — || align=right | 3.3 km || 
|-id=434 bgcolor=#d6d6d6
| 358434 ||  || — || February 21, 2007 || Catalina || CSS || TIR || align=right | 3.3 km || 
|-id=435 bgcolor=#d6d6d6
| 358435 ||  || — || February 16, 2007 || Catalina || CSS || — || align=right | 4.2 km || 
|-id=436 bgcolor=#d6d6d6
| 358436 ||  || — || February 16, 2007 || Palomar || NEAT || — || align=right | 4.3 km || 
|-id=437 bgcolor=#d6d6d6
| 358437 ||  || — || February 22, 2007 || Anderson Mesa || LONEOS || EUP || align=right | 4.5 km || 
|-id=438 bgcolor=#FA8072
| 358438 ||  || — || February 23, 2007 || Catalina || CSS || — || align=right data-sort-value="0.87" | 870 m || 
|-id=439 bgcolor=#d6d6d6
| 358439 ||  || — || February 23, 2007 || Mount Lemmon || Mount Lemmon Survey || LIX || align=right | 4.7 km || 
|-id=440 bgcolor=#d6d6d6
| 358440 ||  || — || February 23, 2007 || Kitt Peak || Spacewatch || — || align=right | 3.4 km || 
|-id=441 bgcolor=#d6d6d6
| 358441 ||  || — || February 23, 2007 || Kitt Peak || Spacewatch || — || align=right | 4.0 km || 
|-id=442 bgcolor=#d6d6d6
| 358442 ||  || — || February 25, 2007 || Mount Lemmon || Mount Lemmon Survey || EOS || align=right | 2.5 km || 
|-id=443 bgcolor=#d6d6d6
| 358443 ||  || — || February 25, 2007 || Mount Lemmon || Mount Lemmon Survey || — || align=right | 3.3 km || 
|-id=444 bgcolor=#d6d6d6
| 358444 ||  || — || February 21, 2007 || Catalina || CSS || ALA || align=right | 5.6 km || 
|-id=445 bgcolor=#d6d6d6
| 358445 ||  || — || February 17, 2007 || Goodricke-Pigott || R. A. Tucker || — || align=right | 6.2 km || 
|-id=446 bgcolor=#d6d6d6
| 358446 ||  || — || February 25, 2007 || Mount Lemmon || Mount Lemmon Survey || 7:4 || align=right | 3.3 km || 
|-id=447 bgcolor=#d6d6d6
| 358447 ||  || — || March 11, 2007 || Kitt Peak || Spacewatch || — || align=right | 2.4 km || 
|-id=448 bgcolor=#d6d6d6
| 358448 ||  || — || March 11, 2007 || Kitt Peak || Spacewatch || 7:4 || align=right | 2.7 km || 
|-id=449 bgcolor=#d6d6d6
| 358449 ||  || — || March 11, 2007 || Anderson Mesa || LONEOS || URS || align=right | 4.5 km || 
|-id=450 bgcolor=#d6d6d6
| 358450 ||  || — || March 12, 2007 || Mount Lemmon || Mount Lemmon Survey || EOS || align=right | 2.3 km || 
|-id=451 bgcolor=#d6d6d6
| 358451 ||  || — || March 10, 2007 || Kitt Peak || Spacewatch || — || align=right | 3.0 km || 
|-id=452 bgcolor=#d6d6d6
| 358452 ||  || — || March 12, 2007 || Kitt Peak || Spacewatch || — || align=right | 3.6 km || 
|-id=453 bgcolor=#FFC2E0
| 358453 ||  || — || March 14, 2007 || Mount Lemmon || Mount Lemmon Survey || APO || align=right data-sort-value="0.37" | 370 m || 
|-id=454 bgcolor=#d6d6d6
| 358454 ||  || — || March 11, 2007 || Mount Lemmon || Mount Lemmon Survey || EOS || align=right | 2.8 km || 
|-id=455 bgcolor=#d6d6d6
| 358455 ||  || — || March 9, 2007 || Mount Lemmon || Mount Lemmon Survey || — || align=right | 2.6 km || 
|-id=456 bgcolor=#d6d6d6
| 358456 ||  || — || March 12, 2007 || Kitt Peak || Spacewatch || THM || align=right | 2.3 km || 
|-id=457 bgcolor=#d6d6d6
| 358457 ||  || — || March 12, 2007 || Mount Lemmon || Mount Lemmon Survey || — || align=right | 3.3 km || 
|-id=458 bgcolor=#d6d6d6
| 358458 ||  || — || February 17, 2007 || Mount Lemmon || Mount Lemmon Survey || EOS || align=right | 2.4 km || 
|-id=459 bgcolor=#d6d6d6
| 358459 ||  || — || February 16, 2007 || Catalina || CSS || EUP || align=right | 4.7 km || 
|-id=460 bgcolor=#d6d6d6
| 358460 ||  || — || March 15, 2007 || Mount Lemmon || Mount Lemmon Survey || — || align=right | 2.7 km || 
|-id=461 bgcolor=#d6d6d6
| 358461 ||  || — || March 19, 2007 || Anderson Mesa || LONEOS || EUP || align=right | 4.7 km || 
|-id=462 bgcolor=#d6d6d6
| 358462 ||  || — || March 20, 2007 || Mount Lemmon || Mount Lemmon Survey || THM || align=right | 2.7 km || 
|-id=463 bgcolor=#d6d6d6
| 358463 ||  || — || September 26, 2003 || Apache Point || SDSS || SYL7:4 || align=right | 4.1 km || 
|-id=464 bgcolor=#d6d6d6
| 358464 ||  || — || April 20, 2007 || Mount Lemmon || Mount Lemmon Survey || — || align=right | 4.1 km || 
|-id=465 bgcolor=#fefefe
| 358465 ||  || — || May 11, 2007 || Mount Lemmon || Mount Lemmon Survey || — || align=right data-sort-value="0.60" | 600 m || 
|-id=466 bgcolor=#fefefe
| 358466 ||  || — || June 7, 2007 || Kitt Peak || Spacewatch || FLO || align=right data-sort-value="0.61" | 610 m || 
|-id=467 bgcolor=#fefefe
| 358467 ||  || — || June 18, 2007 || Kitt Peak || Spacewatch || — || align=right data-sort-value="0.97" | 970 m || 
|-id=468 bgcolor=#fefefe
| 358468 ||  || — || June 16, 2007 || Kitt Peak || Spacewatch || — || align=right data-sort-value="0.91" | 910 m || 
|-id=469 bgcolor=#fefefe
| 358469 ||  || — || July 13, 2007 || Dauban || Chante-Perdrix Obs. || — || align=right data-sort-value="0.95" | 950 m || 
|-id=470 bgcolor=#fefefe
| 358470 ||  || — || July 14, 2007 || Dauban || Chante-Perdrix Obs. || — || align=right data-sort-value="0.96" | 960 m || 
|-id=471 bgcolor=#FFC2E0
| 358471 ||  || — || July 15, 2007 || Siding Spring || SSS || APOPHAcritical || align=right data-sort-value="0.54" | 540 m || 
|-id=472 bgcolor=#fefefe
| 358472 ||  || — || July 20, 2007 || Siding Spring || SSS || PHO || align=right | 2.9 km || 
|-id=473 bgcolor=#FA8072
| 358473 ||  || — || August 5, 2007 || Socorro || LINEAR || — || align=right data-sort-value="0.76" | 760 m || 
|-id=474 bgcolor=#fefefe
| 358474 ||  || — || August 11, 2007 || Socorro || LINEAR || — || align=right data-sort-value="0.93" | 930 m || 
|-id=475 bgcolor=#fefefe
| 358475 ||  || — || August 8, 2007 || Socorro || LINEAR || FLO || align=right data-sort-value="0.84" | 840 m || 
|-id=476 bgcolor=#fefefe
| 358476 ||  || — || August 9, 2007 || Socorro || LINEAR || NYS || align=right data-sort-value="0.70" | 700 m || 
|-id=477 bgcolor=#fefefe
| 358477 ||  || — || August 8, 2007 || Socorro || LINEAR || FLO || align=right data-sort-value="0.62" | 620 m || 
|-id=478 bgcolor=#fefefe
| 358478 ||  || — || August 13, 2007 || Socorro || LINEAR || — || align=right data-sort-value="0.76" | 760 m || 
|-id=479 bgcolor=#fefefe
| 358479 ||  || — || August 10, 2007 || Kitt Peak || Spacewatch || — || align=right data-sort-value="0.70" | 700 m || 
|-id=480 bgcolor=#fefefe
| 358480 ||  || — || August 23, 2007 || Kitt Peak || Spacewatch || — || align=right | 1.0 km || 
|-id=481 bgcolor=#fefefe
| 358481 ||  || — || January 17, 2005 || Kitt Peak || Spacewatch || MAS || align=right data-sort-value="0.86" | 860 m || 
|-id=482 bgcolor=#fefefe
| 358482 || 2007 RL || — || September 1, 2007 || Dauban || C. Rinner, F. Kugel || — || align=right | 1.0 km || 
|-id=483 bgcolor=#fefefe
| 358483 ||  || — || September 1, 2007 || Siding Spring || K. Sárneczky, L. Kiss || FLO || align=right data-sort-value="0.62" | 620 m || 
|-id=484 bgcolor=#fefefe
| 358484 ||  || — || September 3, 2007 || Catalina || CSS || — || align=right data-sort-value="0.72" | 720 m || 
|-id=485 bgcolor=#fefefe
| 358485 ||  || — || September 8, 2007 || Anderson Mesa || LONEOS || NYS || align=right data-sort-value="0.82" | 820 m || 
|-id=486 bgcolor=#fefefe
| 358486 ||  || — || September 9, 2007 || Kitt Peak || Spacewatch || — || align=right | 1.0 km || 
|-id=487 bgcolor=#fefefe
| 358487 ||  || — || September 9, 2007 || Mount Lemmon || Mount Lemmon Survey || — || align=right data-sort-value="0.78" | 780 m || 
|-id=488 bgcolor=#fefefe
| 358488 ||  || — || September 9, 2007 || Anderson Mesa || LONEOS || — || align=right | 1.3 km || 
|-id=489 bgcolor=#E9E9E9
| 358489 ||  || — || September 10, 2007 || Catalina || CSS || — || align=right | 1.4 km || 
|-id=490 bgcolor=#E9E9E9
| 358490 ||  || — || September 10, 2007 || Mount Lemmon || Mount Lemmon Survey || — || align=right | 1.3 km || 
|-id=491 bgcolor=#fefefe
| 358491 ||  || — || September 10, 2007 || Kitt Peak || Spacewatch || NYS || align=right data-sort-value="0.74" | 740 m || 
|-id=492 bgcolor=#fefefe
| 358492 ||  || — || September 10, 2007 || Kitt Peak || Spacewatch || PHO || align=right | 1.3 km || 
|-id=493 bgcolor=#E9E9E9
| 358493 ||  || — || September 10, 2007 || Kitt Peak || Spacewatch || — || align=right data-sort-value="0.96" | 960 m || 
|-id=494 bgcolor=#fefefe
| 358494 ||  || — || September 11, 2007 || Catalina || CSS || FLO || align=right data-sort-value="0.81" | 810 m || 
|-id=495 bgcolor=#fefefe
| 358495 ||  || — || September 11, 2007 || Mount Lemmon || Mount Lemmon Survey || V || align=right data-sort-value="0.95" | 950 m || 
|-id=496 bgcolor=#fefefe
| 358496 ||  || — || September 12, 2007 || Mount Lemmon || Mount Lemmon Survey || V || align=right data-sort-value="0.67" | 670 m || 
|-id=497 bgcolor=#fefefe
| 358497 ||  || — || September 13, 2007 || Socorro || LINEAR || — || align=right | 3.0 km || 
|-id=498 bgcolor=#FA8072
| 358498 ||  || — || September 14, 2007 || Socorro || LINEAR || — || align=right | 1.0 km || 
|-id=499 bgcolor=#fefefe
| 358499 ||  || — || September 12, 2007 || Catalina || CSS || FLO || align=right data-sort-value="0.72" | 720 m || 
|-id=500 bgcolor=#fefefe
| 358500 ||  || — || September 9, 2007 || Mount Lemmon || Mount Lemmon Survey || V || align=right data-sort-value="0.74" | 740 m || 
|}

358501–358600 

|-bgcolor=#C2FFFF
| 358501 ||  || — || August 24, 2007 || Kitt Peak || Spacewatch || L4 || align=right | 7.4 km || 
|-id=502 bgcolor=#fefefe
| 358502 ||  || — || September 10, 2007 || Kitt Peak || Spacewatch || NYS || align=right data-sort-value="0.77" | 770 m || 
|-id=503 bgcolor=#fefefe
| 358503 ||  || — || September 10, 2007 || Kitt Peak || Spacewatch || — || align=right data-sort-value="0.70" | 700 m || 
|-id=504 bgcolor=#fefefe
| 358504 ||  || — || September 10, 2007 || Kitt Peak || Spacewatch || V || align=right data-sort-value="0.88" | 880 m || 
|-id=505 bgcolor=#fefefe
| 358505 ||  || — || September 10, 2007 || Kitt Peak || Spacewatch || V || align=right data-sort-value="0.82" | 820 m || 
|-id=506 bgcolor=#fefefe
| 358506 ||  || — || September 10, 2007 || Kitt Peak || Spacewatch || V || align=right data-sort-value="0.74" | 740 m || 
|-id=507 bgcolor=#fefefe
| 358507 ||  || — || September 13, 2007 || Mount Lemmon || Mount Lemmon Survey || V || align=right data-sort-value="0.58" | 580 m || 
|-id=508 bgcolor=#fefefe
| 358508 ||  || — || September 9, 2007 || Kitt Peak || Spacewatch || — || align=right data-sort-value="0.87" | 870 m || 
|-id=509 bgcolor=#fefefe
| 358509 ||  || — || September 11, 2007 || Kitt Peak || Spacewatch || — || align=right data-sort-value="0.80" | 800 m || 
|-id=510 bgcolor=#fefefe
| 358510 ||  || — || September 11, 2007 || Kitt Peak || Spacewatch || V || align=right data-sort-value="0.65" | 650 m || 
|-id=511 bgcolor=#fefefe
| 358511 ||  || — || September 14, 2007 || Mount Lemmon || Mount Lemmon Survey || MAS || align=right data-sort-value="0.87" | 870 m || 
|-id=512 bgcolor=#fefefe
| 358512 ||  || — || September 14, 2007 || Mount Lemmon || Mount Lemmon Survey || — || align=right | 1.0 km || 
|-id=513 bgcolor=#C2FFFF
| 358513 ||  || — || September 14, 2007 || Kitt Peak || Spacewatch || L4 || align=right | 7.8 km || 
|-id=514 bgcolor=#fefefe
| 358514 ||  || — || September 12, 2007 || Mount Lemmon || Mount Lemmon Survey || V || align=right data-sort-value="0.71" | 710 m || 
|-id=515 bgcolor=#fefefe
| 358515 ||  || — || September 14, 2007 || Mount Lemmon || Mount Lemmon Survey || — || align=right data-sort-value="0.74" | 740 m || 
|-id=516 bgcolor=#fefefe
| 358516 ||  || — || September 14, 2007 || Mount Lemmon || Mount Lemmon Survey || NYS || align=right data-sort-value="0.72" | 720 m || 
|-id=517 bgcolor=#fefefe
| 358517 ||  || — || September 10, 2007 || Kitt Peak || Spacewatch || V || align=right data-sort-value="0.89" | 890 m || 
|-id=518 bgcolor=#C2FFFF
| 358518 ||  || — || September 10, 2007 || Mount Lemmon || Mount Lemmon Survey || L4 || align=right | 6.9 km || 
|-id=519 bgcolor=#C2FFFF
| 358519 ||  || — || September 10, 2007 || Mount Lemmon || Mount Lemmon Survey || L4 || align=right | 7.7 km || 
|-id=520 bgcolor=#fefefe
| 358520 ||  || — || August 12, 2007 || Socorro || LINEAR || — || align=right | 1.1 km || 
|-id=521 bgcolor=#E9E9E9
| 358521 ||  || — || September 14, 2007 || Mount Lemmon || Mount Lemmon Survey || RAF || align=right data-sort-value="0.84" | 840 m || 
|-id=522 bgcolor=#fefefe
| 358522 ||  || — || September 11, 2007 || Kitt Peak || Spacewatch || FLO || align=right data-sort-value="0.87" | 870 m || 
|-id=523 bgcolor=#E9E9E9
| 358523 ||  || — || September 14, 2007 || Mount Lemmon || Mount Lemmon Survey || — || align=right | 1.1 km || 
|-id=524 bgcolor=#fefefe
| 358524 ||  || — || September 20, 2007 || Altschwendt || W. Ries || — || align=right data-sort-value="0.92" | 920 m || 
|-id=525 bgcolor=#fefefe
| 358525 ||  || — || September 30, 2007 || Kitt Peak || Spacewatch || V || align=right data-sort-value="0.68" | 680 m || 
|-id=526 bgcolor=#E9E9E9
| 358526 ||  || — || September 18, 2007 || Mount Lemmon || Mount Lemmon Survey || — || align=right | 1.6 km || 
|-id=527 bgcolor=#fefefe
| 358527 ||  || — || October 7, 2007 || Dauban || Chante-Perdrix Obs. || V || align=right | 1.0 km || 
|-id=528 bgcolor=#fefefe
| 358528 ||  || — || October 6, 2007 || Socorro || LINEAR || — || align=right data-sort-value="0.92" | 920 m || 
|-id=529 bgcolor=#fefefe
| 358529 ||  || — || October 6, 2007 || Socorro || LINEAR || — || align=right | 1.7 km || 
|-id=530 bgcolor=#E9E9E9
| 358530 ||  || — || October 9, 2007 || Catalina || CSS || EUN || align=right | 1.3 km || 
|-id=531 bgcolor=#fefefe
| 358531 ||  || — || October 4, 2007 || Kitt Peak || Spacewatch || MAS || align=right data-sort-value="0.70" | 700 m || 
|-id=532 bgcolor=#fefefe
| 358532 ||  || — || August 23, 2007 || Kitt Peak || Spacewatch || — || align=right | 1.0 km || 
|-id=533 bgcolor=#E9E9E9
| 358533 ||  || — || October 7, 2007 || Catalina || CSS || — || align=right | 1.5 km || 
|-id=534 bgcolor=#E9E9E9
| 358534 ||  || — || October 7, 2007 || Kitt Peak || Spacewatch || — || align=right | 1.3 km || 
|-id=535 bgcolor=#fefefe
| 358535 ||  || — || October 4, 2007 || Kitt Peak || Spacewatch || — || align=right | 1.0 km || 
|-id=536 bgcolor=#E9E9E9
| 358536 ||  || — || October 4, 2007 || Kitt Peak || Spacewatch || — || align=right data-sort-value="0.91" | 910 m || 
|-id=537 bgcolor=#fefefe
| 358537 ||  || — || October 4, 2007 || Kitt Peak || Spacewatch || — || align=right | 1.5 km || 
|-id=538 bgcolor=#E9E9E9
| 358538 ||  || — || October 10, 2007 || Dauban || Chante-Perdrix Obs. || — || align=right data-sort-value="0.73" | 730 m || 
|-id=539 bgcolor=#fefefe
| 358539 ||  || — || March 26, 2003 || Kitt Peak || Spacewatch || — || align=right data-sort-value="0.83" | 830 m || 
|-id=540 bgcolor=#fefefe
| 358540 ||  || — || October 5, 2007 || La Cañada || J. Lacruz || — || align=right data-sort-value="0.69" | 690 m || 
|-id=541 bgcolor=#E9E9E9
| 358541 ||  || — || October 8, 2007 || Mount Lemmon || Mount Lemmon Survey || — || align=right data-sort-value="0.67" | 670 m || 
|-id=542 bgcolor=#E9E9E9
| 358542 ||  || — || October 8, 2007 || Mount Lemmon || Mount Lemmon Survey || — || align=right | 1.3 km || 
|-id=543 bgcolor=#E9E9E9
| 358543 ||  || — || October 9, 2007 || Catalina || CSS || EUN || align=right | 1.2 km || 
|-id=544 bgcolor=#E9E9E9
| 358544 ||  || — || September 8, 2007 || Mount Lemmon || Mount Lemmon Survey || — || align=right | 1.8 km || 
|-id=545 bgcolor=#fefefe
| 358545 ||  || — || October 6, 2007 || Kitt Peak || Spacewatch || — || align=right data-sort-value="0.83" | 830 m || 
|-id=546 bgcolor=#E9E9E9
| 358546 ||  || — || October 6, 2007 || Kitt Peak || Spacewatch || — || align=right data-sort-value="0.76" | 760 m || 
|-id=547 bgcolor=#fefefe
| 358547 ||  || — || October 7, 2007 || Mount Lemmon || Mount Lemmon Survey || CIM || align=right | 2.3 km || 
|-id=548 bgcolor=#E9E9E9
| 358548 ||  || — || October 7, 2007 || Socorro || LINEAR || — || align=right | 1.1 km || 
|-id=549 bgcolor=#E9E9E9
| 358549 ||  || — || October 9, 2007 || Socorro || LINEAR || — || align=right | 1.5 km || 
|-id=550 bgcolor=#fefefe
| 358550 ||  || — || October 9, 2007 || Socorro || LINEAR || FLO || align=right data-sort-value="0.88" | 880 m || 
|-id=551 bgcolor=#FA8072
| 358551 ||  || — || October 9, 2007 || Socorro || LINEAR || — || align=right | 1.1 km || 
|-id=552 bgcolor=#fefefe
| 358552 ||  || — || October 11, 2007 || Socorro || LINEAR || NYS || align=right data-sort-value="0.72" | 720 m || 
|-id=553 bgcolor=#E9E9E9
| 358553 ||  || — || October 11, 2007 || Socorro || LINEAR || — || align=right | 1.3 km || 
|-id=554 bgcolor=#E9E9E9
| 358554 ||  || — || October 11, 2007 || Socorro || LINEAR || JUN || align=right | 1.1 km || 
|-id=555 bgcolor=#fefefe
| 358555 ||  || — || October 4, 2007 || Mount Lemmon || Mount Lemmon Survey || — || align=right data-sort-value="0.71" | 710 m || 
|-id=556 bgcolor=#d6d6d6
| 358556 ||  || — || October 8, 2007 || Kitt Peak || Spacewatch || — || align=right | 2.3 km || 
|-id=557 bgcolor=#E9E9E9
| 358557 ||  || — || October 8, 2007 || Kitt Peak || Spacewatch || — || align=right | 1.2 km || 
|-id=558 bgcolor=#fefefe
| 358558 ||  || — || October 8, 2007 || Anderson Mesa || LONEOS || — || align=right | 1.3 km || 
|-id=559 bgcolor=#E9E9E9
| 358559 ||  || — || October 9, 2007 || Kitt Peak || Spacewatch || — || align=right data-sort-value="0.79" | 790 m || 
|-id=560 bgcolor=#E9E9E9
| 358560 ||  || — || October 8, 2007 || Kitt Peak || Spacewatch || — || align=right data-sort-value="0.82" | 820 m || 
|-id=561 bgcolor=#E9E9E9
| 358561 ||  || — || October 8, 2007 || Kitt Peak || Spacewatch || — || align=right | 1.5 km || 
|-id=562 bgcolor=#fefefe
| 358562 ||  || — || October 9, 2007 || Kitt Peak || Spacewatch || V || align=right data-sort-value="0.80" | 800 m || 
|-id=563 bgcolor=#fefefe
| 358563 ||  || — || October 10, 2007 || Mount Lemmon || Mount Lemmon Survey || MAS || align=right data-sort-value="0.83" | 830 m || 
|-id=564 bgcolor=#E9E9E9
| 358564 ||  || — || October 7, 2007 || Mount Lemmon || Mount Lemmon Survey || — || align=right | 1.3 km || 
|-id=565 bgcolor=#E9E9E9
| 358565 ||  || — || October 10, 2007 || Kitt Peak || Spacewatch || — || align=right | 1.2 km || 
|-id=566 bgcolor=#fefefe
| 358566 ||  || — || October 12, 2007 || Kitt Peak || Spacewatch || — || align=right data-sort-value="0.88" | 880 m || 
|-id=567 bgcolor=#E9E9E9
| 358567 ||  || — || October 11, 2007 || Kitt Peak || Spacewatch || — || align=right | 1.0 km || 
|-id=568 bgcolor=#E9E9E9
| 358568 ||  || — || October 12, 2007 || Catalina || CSS || — || align=right data-sort-value="0.97" | 970 m || 
|-id=569 bgcolor=#fefefe
| 358569 ||  || — || October 9, 2007 || Mount Lemmon || Mount Lemmon Survey || — || align=right data-sort-value="0.90" | 900 m || 
|-id=570 bgcolor=#fefefe
| 358570 ||  || — || October 8, 2007 || Mount Lemmon || Mount Lemmon Survey || — || align=right | 1.1 km || 
|-id=571 bgcolor=#E9E9E9
| 358571 ||  || — || October 10, 2007 || Kitt Peak || Spacewatch || — || align=right | 1.6 km || 
|-id=572 bgcolor=#fefefe
| 358572 ||  || — || October 14, 2007 || Mount Lemmon || Mount Lemmon Survey || — || align=right | 1.1 km || 
|-id=573 bgcolor=#fefefe
| 358573 ||  || — || October 14, 2007 || Kitt Peak || Spacewatch || — || align=right | 1.3 km || 
|-id=574 bgcolor=#fefefe
| 358574 ||  || — || January 13, 2005 || Kitt Peak || Spacewatch || V || align=right data-sort-value="0.82" | 820 m || 
|-id=575 bgcolor=#E9E9E9
| 358575 ||  || — || October 4, 2007 || Kitt Peak || Spacewatch || — || align=right | 1.2 km || 
|-id=576 bgcolor=#E9E9E9
| 358576 ||  || — || October 4, 2007 || Kitt Peak || Spacewatch || — || align=right | 1.9 km || 
|-id=577 bgcolor=#E9E9E9
| 358577 ||  || — || October 7, 2007 || Kitt Peak || Spacewatch || — || align=right | 1.6 km || 
|-id=578 bgcolor=#E9E9E9
| 358578 ||  || — || October 9, 2007 || Mount Lemmon || Mount Lemmon Survey || KON || align=right | 1.8 km || 
|-id=579 bgcolor=#E9E9E9
| 358579 ||  || — || October 10, 2007 || Catalina || CSS || — || align=right | 1.3 km || 
|-id=580 bgcolor=#d6d6d6
| 358580 ||  || — || October 12, 2007 || Mount Lemmon || Mount Lemmon Survey || — || align=right | 3.2 km || 
|-id=581 bgcolor=#E9E9E9
| 358581 ||  || — || October 19, 2007 || Bisei SG Center || BATTeRS || — || align=right | 1.5 km || 
|-id=582 bgcolor=#E9E9E9
| 358582 ||  || — || October 16, 2007 || Catalina || CSS || — || align=right | 1.2 km || 
|-id=583 bgcolor=#fefefe
| 358583 ||  || — || October 16, 2007 || Kitt Peak || Spacewatch || NYS || align=right data-sort-value="0.70" | 700 m || 
|-id=584 bgcolor=#E9E9E9
| 358584 ||  || — || October 8, 2007 || Kitt Peak || Spacewatch || — || align=right data-sort-value="0.81" | 810 m || 
|-id=585 bgcolor=#E9E9E9
| 358585 ||  || — || October 8, 2007 || Anderson Mesa || LONEOS || — || align=right | 1.0 km || 
|-id=586 bgcolor=#E9E9E9
| 358586 ||  || — || October 19, 2007 || Catalina || CSS || — || align=right data-sort-value="0.99" | 990 m || 
|-id=587 bgcolor=#fefefe
| 358587 ||  || — || October 7, 2007 || Catalina || CSS || — || align=right data-sort-value="0.98" | 980 m || 
|-id=588 bgcolor=#E9E9E9
| 358588 ||  || — || October 10, 2007 || Anderson Mesa || LONEOS || — || align=right | 1.6 km || 
|-id=589 bgcolor=#E9E9E9
| 358589 ||  || — || September 11, 2007 || Catalina || CSS || — || align=right | 1.5 km || 
|-id=590 bgcolor=#E9E9E9
| 358590 ||  || — || October 30, 2007 || Kitt Peak || Spacewatch || — || align=right data-sort-value="0.82" | 820 m || 
|-id=591 bgcolor=#E9E9E9
| 358591 ||  || — || October 30, 2007 || Mount Lemmon || Mount Lemmon Survey || — || align=right data-sort-value="0.86" | 860 m || 
|-id=592 bgcolor=#fefefe
| 358592 ||  || — || October 30, 2007 || Catalina || CSS || V || align=right data-sort-value="0.88" | 880 m || 
|-id=593 bgcolor=#fefefe
| 358593 ||  || — || October 31, 2007 || Mount Lemmon || Mount Lemmon Survey || — || align=right | 1.1 km || 
|-id=594 bgcolor=#E9E9E9
| 358594 ||  || — || October 31, 2007 || Mount Lemmon || Mount Lemmon Survey || — || align=right data-sort-value="0.80" | 800 m || 
|-id=595 bgcolor=#fefefe
| 358595 ||  || — || October 30, 2007 || Kitt Peak || Spacewatch || — || align=right data-sort-value="0.84" | 840 m || 
|-id=596 bgcolor=#fefefe
| 358596 ||  || — || October 31, 2007 || Mount Lemmon || Mount Lemmon Survey || NYS || align=right data-sort-value="0.68" | 680 m || 
|-id=597 bgcolor=#E9E9E9
| 358597 ||  || — || October 30, 2007 || Kitt Peak || Spacewatch || — || align=right | 1.2 km || 
|-id=598 bgcolor=#E9E9E9
| 358598 ||  || — || October 30, 2007 || Kitt Peak || Spacewatch || — || align=right | 1.2 km || 
|-id=599 bgcolor=#E9E9E9
| 358599 ||  || — || October 16, 2007 || Kitt Peak || Spacewatch || JUN || align=right data-sort-value="0.93" | 930 m || 
|-id=600 bgcolor=#E9E9E9
| 358600 ||  || — || October 25, 2007 || Mount Lemmon || Mount Lemmon Survey || — || align=right data-sort-value="0.94" | 940 m || 
|}

358601–358700 

|-bgcolor=#fefefe
| 358601 ||  || — || October 16, 2007 || Mount Lemmon || Mount Lemmon Survey || — || align=right | 1.0 km || 
|-id=602 bgcolor=#E9E9E9
| 358602 ||  || — || November 2, 2007 || Mayhill || A. Lowe || — || align=right | 1.8 km || 
|-id=603 bgcolor=#E9E9E9
| 358603 ||  || — || November 2, 2007 || Kitami || K. Endate || — || align=right | 1.6 km || 
|-id=604 bgcolor=#FA8072
| 358604 ||  || — || November 2, 2007 || Tiki || N. Teamo || — || align=right | 1.8 km || 
|-id=605 bgcolor=#E9E9E9
| 358605 ||  || — || November 4, 2007 || La Sagra || OAM Obs. || — || align=right | 2.6 km || 
|-id=606 bgcolor=#E9E9E9
| 358606 ||  || — || November 2, 2007 || Kitt Peak || Spacewatch || — || align=right | 1.1 km || 
|-id=607 bgcolor=#E9E9E9
| 358607 ||  || — || November 5, 2007 || Mount Lemmon || Mount Lemmon Survey || HNS || align=right | 1.4 km || 
|-id=608 bgcolor=#E9E9E9
| 358608 ||  || — || November 2, 2007 || Kitt Peak || Spacewatch || — || align=right data-sort-value="0.80" | 800 m || 
|-id=609 bgcolor=#E9E9E9
| 358609 ||  || — || November 1, 2007 || Kitt Peak || Spacewatch || GEF || align=right | 1.1 km || 
|-id=610 bgcolor=#E9E9E9
| 358610 ||  || — || August 24, 2007 || Kitt Peak || Spacewatch || — || align=right | 1.4 km || 
|-id=611 bgcolor=#E9E9E9
| 358611 ||  || — || November 2, 2007 || Catalina || CSS || ADE || align=right | 2.6 km || 
|-id=612 bgcolor=#E9E9E9
| 358612 ||  || — || November 3, 2007 || Kitt Peak || Spacewatch || — || align=right data-sort-value="0.89" | 890 m || 
|-id=613 bgcolor=#fefefe
| 358613 ||  || — || October 12, 2007 || Kitt Peak || Spacewatch || MAS || align=right data-sort-value="0.88" | 880 m || 
|-id=614 bgcolor=#E9E9E9
| 358614 ||  || — || November 2, 2007 || Socorro || LINEAR || — || align=right | 1.7 km || 
|-id=615 bgcolor=#fefefe
| 358615 ||  || — || November 4, 2007 || Socorro || LINEAR || — || align=right data-sort-value="0.97" | 970 m || 
|-id=616 bgcolor=#E9E9E9
| 358616 ||  || — || November 1, 2007 || Kitt Peak || Spacewatch || — || align=right | 1.3 km || 
|-id=617 bgcolor=#E9E9E9
| 358617 ||  || — || November 3, 2007 || Kitt Peak || Spacewatch || — || align=right | 1.2 km || 
|-id=618 bgcolor=#E9E9E9
| 358618 ||  || — || November 4, 2007 || Purple Mountain || PMO NEO || KON || align=right | 2.6 km || 
|-id=619 bgcolor=#E9E9E9
| 358619 ||  || — || November 5, 2007 || Kitt Peak || Spacewatch || — || align=right data-sort-value="0.92" | 920 m || 
|-id=620 bgcolor=#E9E9E9
| 358620 ||  || — || November 5, 2007 || Kitt Peak || Spacewatch || — || align=right | 1.3 km || 
|-id=621 bgcolor=#fefefe
| 358621 ||  || — || November 5, 2007 || Kitt Peak || Spacewatch || — || align=right | 1.1 km || 
|-id=622 bgcolor=#E9E9E9
| 358622 ||  || — || November 4, 2007 || Kitt Peak || Spacewatch || — || align=right data-sort-value="0.96" | 960 m || 
|-id=623 bgcolor=#d6d6d6
| 358623 ||  || — || November 4, 2007 || Kitt Peak || Spacewatch || — || align=right | 2.9 km || 
|-id=624 bgcolor=#E9E9E9
| 358624 ||  || — || November 4, 2007 || Kitt Peak || Spacewatch || — || align=right | 1.5 km || 
|-id=625 bgcolor=#fefefe
| 358625 ||  || — || November 4, 2007 || Kitt Peak || Spacewatch || — || align=right | 1.1 km || 
|-id=626 bgcolor=#fefefe
| 358626 ||  || — || October 18, 2007 || Kitt Peak || Spacewatch || V || align=right data-sort-value="0.64" | 640 m || 
|-id=627 bgcolor=#E9E9E9
| 358627 ||  || — || November 5, 2007 || Kitt Peak || Spacewatch || IAN || align=right data-sort-value="0.81" | 810 m || 
|-id=628 bgcolor=#E9E9E9
| 358628 ||  || — || November 5, 2007 || Kitt Peak || Spacewatch || — || align=right | 1.1 km || 
|-id=629 bgcolor=#FA8072
| 358629 ||  || — || November 5, 2007 || Kitt Peak || Spacewatch || — || align=right | 1.0 km || 
|-id=630 bgcolor=#fefefe
| 358630 ||  || — || November 5, 2007 || Kitt Peak || Spacewatch || — || align=right | 1.2 km || 
|-id=631 bgcolor=#E9E9E9
| 358631 ||  || — || November 7, 2007 || Mount Lemmon || Mount Lemmon Survey || — || align=right data-sort-value="0.85" | 850 m || 
|-id=632 bgcolor=#E9E9E9
| 358632 ||  || — || November 5, 2007 || Mount Lemmon || Mount Lemmon Survey || EUN || align=right | 1.3 km || 
|-id=633 bgcolor=#fefefe
| 358633 ||  || — || November 9, 2007 || Kitt Peak || Spacewatch || — || align=right data-sort-value="0.92" | 920 m || 
|-id=634 bgcolor=#E9E9E9
| 358634 ||  || — || October 17, 2007 || Mount Lemmon || Mount Lemmon Survey || — || align=right data-sort-value="0.90" | 900 m || 
|-id=635 bgcolor=#fefefe
| 358635 ||  || — || November 13, 2007 || Kitt Peak || Spacewatch || NYS || align=right data-sort-value="0.73" | 730 m || 
|-id=636 bgcolor=#E9E9E9
| 358636 ||  || — || November 12, 2007 || Catalina || CSS || — || align=right | 2.1 km || 
|-id=637 bgcolor=#E9E9E9
| 358637 ||  || — || November 12, 2007 || Catalina || CSS || MIS || align=right | 2.8 km || 
|-id=638 bgcolor=#E9E9E9
| 358638 ||  || — || November 13, 2007 || Kitt Peak || Spacewatch || — || align=right | 2.4 km || 
|-id=639 bgcolor=#E9E9E9
| 358639 ||  || — || November 11, 2007 || Socorro || LINEAR || — || align=right | 1.8 km || 
|-id=640 bgcolor=#E9E9E9
| 358640 ||  || — || October 24, 2007 || Mount Lemmon || Mount Lemmon Survey || — || align=right | 1.6 km || 
|-id=641 bgcolor=#E9E9E9
| 358641 ||  || — || November 6, 2007 || Kitt Peak || Spacewatch || — || align=right | 1.8 km || 
|-id=642 bgcolor=#fefefe
| 358642 ||  || — || October 17, 2007 || Mount Lemmon || Mount Lemmon Survey || — || align=right | 1.1 km || 
|-id=643 bgcolor=#E9E9E9
| 358643 ||  || — || November 14, 2007 || Kitt Peak || Spacewatch || — || align=right | 1.5 km || 
|-id=644 bgcolor=#E9E9E9
| 358644 ||  || — || October 16, 2007 || Catalina || CSS || BRG || align=right | 1.6 km || 
|-id=645 bgcolor=#E9E9E9
| 358645 ||  || — || October 30, 2007 || Catalina || CSS || — || align=right | 2.3 km || 
|-id=646 bgcolor=#E9E9E9
| 358646 ||  || — || November 13, 2007 || Anderson Mesa || LONEOS || — || align=right data-sort-value="0.89" | 890 m || 
|-id=647 bgcolor=#E9E9E9
| 358647 ||  || — || November 5, 2007 || Mount Lemmon || Mount Lemmon Survey || HEN || align=right | 1.1 km || 
|-id=648 bgcolor=#E9E9E9
| 358648 ||  || — || November 1, 2007 || Kitt Peak || Spacewatch || MRX || align=right data-sort-value="0.92" | 920 m || 
|-id=649 bgcolor=#E9E9E9
| 358649 ||  || — || November 9, 2007 || Mount Lemmon || Mount Lemmon Survey || AER || align=right | 1.5 km || 
|-id=650 bgcolor=#E9E9E9
| 358650 ||  || — || November 2, 2007 || Kitt Peak || Spacewatch || — || align=right | 1.1 km || 
|-id=651 bgcolor=#E9E9E9
| 358651 ||  || — || November 14, 2007 || Kitt Peak || Spacewatch || — || align=right | 1.3 km || 
|-id=652 bgcolor=#E9E9E9
| 358652 ||  || — || November 7, 2007 || Kitt Peak || Spacewatch || NEM || align=right | 1.9 km || 
|-id=653 bgcolor=#E9E9E9
| 358653 ||  || — || November 8, 2007 || Catalina || CSS || — || align=right | 1.7 km || 
|-id=654 bgcolor=#E9E9E9
| 358654 ||  || — || November 2, 2007 || Kitt Peak || Spacewatch || GER || align=right | 1.9 km || 
|-id=655 bgcolor=#E9E9E9
| 358655 ||  || — || November 1, 2007 || Kitt Peak || Spacewatch || — || align=right | 1.4 km || 
|-id=656 bgcolor=#fefefe
| 358656 ||  || — || November 2, 2007 || Kitt Peak || Spacewatch || — || align=right | 1.3 km || 
|-id=657 bgcolor=#E9E9E9
| 358657 ||  || — || November 8, 2007 || Catalina || CSS || HNS || align=right | 1.3 km || 
|-id=658 bgcolor=#E9E9E9
| 358658 ||  || — || July 11, 2002 || Campo Imperatore || CINEOS || — || align=right | 1.4 km || 
|-id=659 bgcolor=#E9E9E9
| 358659 ||  || — || November 13, 2007 || Kitt Peak || Spacewatch || — || align=right | 2.4 km || 
|-id=660 bgcolor=#E9E9E9
| 358660 ||  || — || November 16, 2007 || Mount Lemmon || Mount Lemmon Survey || JUN || align=right data-sort-value="0.97" | 970 m || 
|-id=661 bgcolor=#E9E9E9
| 358661 ||  || — || November 17, 2007 || Socorro || LINEAR || — || align=right | 1.6 km || 
|-id=662 bgcolor=#E9E9E9
| 358662 ||  || — || November 18, 2007 || Socorro || LINEAR || — || align=right | 1.2 km || 
|-id=663 bgcolor=#E9E9E9
| 358663 ||  || — || November 2, 2007 || Mount Lemmon || Mount Lemmon Survey || — || align=right | 4.1 km || 
|-id=664 bgcolor=#E9E9E9
| 358664 ||  || — || November 16, 2007 || Mount Lemmon || Mount Lemmon Survey || — || align=right | 1.2 km || 
|-id=665 bgcolor=#E9E9E9
| 358665 ||  || — || November 18, 2007 || Mount Lemmon || Mount Lemmon Survey || — || align=right | 1.8 km || 
|-id=666 bgcolor=#E9E9E9
| 358666 ||  || — || November 19, 2007 || Mount Lemmon || Mount Lemmon Survey || — || align=right | 1.2 km || 
|-id=667 bgcolor=#E9E9E9
| 358667 ||  || — || November 18, 2007 || Mount Lemmon || Mount Lemmon Survey || — || align=right | 3.1 km || 
|-id=668 bgcolor=#E9E9E9
| 358668 ||  || — || December 1, 2007 || Bisei SG Center || BATTeRS || — || align=right | 1.7 km || 
|-id=669 bgcolor=#E9E9E9
| 358669 ||  || — || December 3, 2007 || Catalina || CSS || — || align=right | 3.0 km || 
|-id=670 bgcolor=#E9E9E9
| 358670 ||  || — || December 10, 2007 || Socorro || LINEAR || — || align=right | 1.6 km || 
|-id=671 bgcolor=#d6d6d6
| 358671 ||  || — || December 10, 2007 || Socorro || LINEAR || — || align=right | 7.8 km || 
|-id=672 bgcolor=#E9E9E9
| 358672 ||  || — || November 2, 2007 || Mount Lemmon || Mount Lemmon Survey || — || align=right | 2.7 km || 
|-id=673 bgcolor=#E9E9E9
| 358673 ||  || — || December 14, 2007 || Mount Lemmon || Mount Lemmon Survey || GEF || align=right | 1.7 km || 
|-id=674 bgcolor=#E9E9E9
| 358674 ||  || — || December 5, 2007 || Kitt Peak || Spacewatch || NEM || align=right | 2.2 km || 
|-id=675 bgcolor=#E9E9E9
| 358675 Bente ||  ||  || December 16, 2007 || Uccle || P. De Cat || — || align=right | 1.9 km || 
|-id=676 bgcolor=#E9E9E9
| 358676 ||  || — || October 21, 2007 || Kitt Peak || Spacewatch || — || align=right | 1.4 km || 
|-id=677 bgcolor=#E9E9E9
| 358677 ||  || — || December 16, 2007 || Kitt Peak || Spacewatch || — || align=right data-sort-value="0.96" | 960 m || 
|-id=678 bgcolor=#E9E9E9
| 358678 ||  || — || December 16, 2007 || Catalina || CSS || — || align=right | 2.1 km || 
|-id=679 bgcolor=#E9E9E9
| 358679 ||  || — || December 4, 2007 || Mount Lemmon || Mount Lemmon Survey || WIT || align=right | 1.3 km || 
|-id=680 bgcolor=#fefefe
| 358680 ||  || — || December 16, 2007 || Kitt Peak || Spacewatch || — || align=right | 1.4 km || 
|-id=681 bgcolor=#E9E9E9
| 358681 ||  || — || December 17, 2007 || Mount Lemmon || Mount Lemmon Survey || NEM || align=right | 2.5 km || 
|-id=682 bgcolor=#d6d6d6
| 358682 ||  || — || December 30, 2007 || Mount Lemmon || Mount Lemmon Survey || KOR || align=right | 1.5 km || 
|-id=683 bgcolor=#E9E9E9
| 358683 ||  || — || December 30, 2007 || Mount Lemmon || Mount Lemmon Survey || — || align=right | 2.4 km || 
|-id=684 bgcolor=#E9E9E9
| 358684 ||  || — || December 28, 2007 || Kitt Peak || Spacewatch || — || align=right | 3.3 km || 
|-id=685 bgcolor=#E9E9E9
| 358685 ||  || — || December 6, 2007 || Kitt Peak || Spacewatch || — || align=right | 1.3 km || 
|-id=686 bgcolor=#E9E9E9
| 358686 ||  || — || December 31, 2007 || Kitt Peak || Spacewatch || — || align=right | 2.3 km || 
|-id=687 bgcolor=#E9E9E9
| 358687 ||  || — || March 16, 2004 || Kitt Peak || Spacewatch || — || align=right | 2.3 km || 
|-id=688 bgcolor=#d6d6d6
| 358688 ||  || — || December 31, 2007 || Mount Lemmon || Mount Lemmon Survey || JLI || align=right | 3.2 km || 
|-id=689 bgcolor=#E9E9E9
| 358689 ||  || — || December 30, 2007 || Mount Lemmon || Mount Lemmon Survey || — || align=right | 1.9 km || 
|-id=690 bgcolor=#E9E9E9
| 358690 ||  || — || January 10, 2008 || Mount Lemmon || Mount Lemmon Survey || — || align=right | 1.5 km || 
|-id=691 bgcolor=#E9E9E9
| 358691 ||  || — || January 10, 2008 || Kitt Peak || Spacewatch || — || align=right | 2.2 km || 
|-id=692 bgcolor=#E9E9E9
| 358692 ||  || — || January 10, 2008 || Kitt Peak || Spacewatch || — || align=right | 2.3 km || 
|-id=693 bgcolor=#E9E9E9
| 358693 ||  || — || January 10, 2008 || Mount Lemmon || Mount Lemmon Survey || NEM || align=right | 2.2 km || 
|-id=694 bgcolor=#d6d6d6
| 358694 ||  || — || January 10, 2008 || Mount Lemmon || Mount Lemmon Survey || KOR || align=right | 1.4 km || 
|-id=695 bgcolor=#d6d6d6
| 358695 ||  || — || January 10, 2008 || Mount Lemmon || Mount Lemmon Survey || — || align=right | 5.1 km || 
|-id=696 bgcolor=#E9E9E9
| 358696 ||  || — || January 11, 2008 || Desert Eagle || W. K. Y. Yeung || — || align=right | 3.1 km || 
|-id=697 bgcolor=#E9E9E9
| 358697 ||  || — || January 10, 2008 || Kitt Peak || Spacewatch || — || align=right | 2.2 km || 
|-id=698 bgcolor=#d6d6d6
| 358698 ||  || — || December 30, 2007 || Mount Lemmon || Mount Lemmon Survey || — || align=right | 3.1 km || 
|-id=699 bgcolor=#E9E9E9
| 358699 ||  || — || January 11, 2008 || Kitt Peak || Spacewatch || — || align=right | 2.0 km || 
|-id=700 bgcolor=#d6d6d6
| 358700 ||  || — || January 11, 2008 || Catalina || CSS || URS || align=right | 3.7 km || 
|}

358701–358800 

|-bgcolor=#E9E9E9
| 358701 ||  || — || January 11, 2008 || Mount Lemmon || Mount Lemmon Survey || — || align=right | 2.8 km || 
|-id=702 bgcolor=#E9E9E9
| 358702 ||  || — || January 12, 2008 || Kitt Peak || Spacewatch || WIT || align=right | 1.1 km || 
|-id=703 bgcolor=#E9E9E9
| 358703 ||  || — || January 12, 2008 || Kitt Peak || Spacewatch || — || align=right | 2.2 km || 
|-id=704 bgcolor=#E9E9E9
| 358704 ||  || — || January 12, 2008 || Kitt Peak || Spacewatch || — || align=right | 2.3 km || 
|-id=705 bgcolor=#E9E9E9
| 358705 ||  || — || January 15, 2008 || Mount Lemmon || Mount Lemmon Survey || MRX || align=right | 1.0 km || 
|-id=706 bgcolor=#E9E9E9
| 358706 ||  || — || January 15, 2008 || Mount Lemmon || Mount Lemmon Survey || — || align=right | 2.8 km || 
|-id=707 bgcolor=#E9E9E9
| 358707 ||  || — || November 18, 2007 || Mount Lemmon || Mount Lemmon Survey || NEM || align=right | 2.1 km || 
|-id=708 bgcolor=#E9E9E9
| 358708 ||  || — || January 14, 2008 || Kitt Peak || Spacewatch || — || align=right | 1.9 km || 
|-id=709 bgcolor=#E9E9E9
| 358709 ||  || — || December 31, 2007 || Kitt Peak || Spacewatch || MRX || align=right data-sort-value="0.96" | 960 m || 
|-id=710 bgcolor=#E9E9E9
| 358710 ||  || — || January 15, 2008 || Kitt Peak || Spacewatch || — || align=right | 1.6 km || 
|-id=711 bgcolor=#d6d6d6
| 358711 ||  || — || January 15, 2008 || Mount Lemmon || Mount Lemmon Survey || — || align=right | 1.9 km || 
|-id=712 bgcolor=#E9E9E9
| 358712 ||  || — || January 6, 2008 || Mauna Kea || P. A. Wiegert || — || align=right | 3.3 km || 
|-id=713 bgcolor=#E9E9E9
| 358713 ||  || — || January 5, 2008 || Lulin Observatory || LUSS || WAT || align=right | 2.1 km || 
|-id=714 bgcolor=#E9E9E9
| 358714 ||  || — || January 11, 2008 || Catalina || CSS || GEF || align=right | 1.8 km || 
|-id=715 bgcolor=#d6d6d6
| 358715 ||  || — || January 16, 2008 || Kitt Peak || Spacewatch || CHA || align=right | 2.1 km || 
|-id=716 bgcolor=#d6d6d6
| 358716 ||  || — || January 31, 2008 || Mount Lemmon || Mount Lemmon Survey || — || align=right | 2.9 km || 
|-id=717 bgcolor=#E9E9E9
| 358717 ||  || — || January 30, 2008 || Catalina || CSS || — || align=right | 2.0 km || 
|-id=718 bgcolor=#E9E9E9
| 358718 ||  || — || January 16, 2008 || Kitt Peak || Spacewatch || NEM || align=right | 1.9 km || 
|-id=719 bgcolor=#E9E9E9
| 358719 ||  || — || January 30, 2008 || Mount Lemmon || Mount Lemmon Survey || HOF || align=right | 2.4 km || 
|-id=720 bgcolor=#E9E9E9
| 358720 ||  || — || January 30, 2008 || Kitt Peak || Spacewatch || — || align=right | 2.9 km || 
|-id=721 bgcolor=#E9E9E9
| 358721 ||  || — || January 31, 2008 || Catalina || CSS || DOR || align=right | 2.5 km || 
|-id=722 bgcolor=#E9E9E9
| 358722 ||  || — || January 30, 2008 || Kitt Peak || Spacewatch || — || align=right | 2.9 km || 
|-id=723 bgcolor=#d6d6d6
| 358723 ||  || — || January 31, 2008 || Mount Lemmon || Mount Lemmon Survey || EMA || align=right | 2.8 km || 
|-id=724 bgcolor=#E9E9E9
| 358724 ||  || — || February 3, 2008 || Altschwendt || W. Ries || — || align=right | 3.9 km || 
|-id=725 bgcolor=#E9E9E9
| 358725 ||  || — || February 1, 2008 || Kitt Peak || Spacewatch || — || align=right | 3.2 km || 
|-id=726 bgcolor=#E9E9E9
| 358726 ||  || — || February 3, 2008 || Kitt Peak || Spacewatch || MRX || align=right | 1.3 km || 
|-id=727 bgcolor=#E9E9E9
| 358727 ||  || — || February 3, 2008 || Mount Lemmon || Mount Lemmon Survey || NEM || align=right | 2.8 km || 
|-id=728 bgcolor=#d6d6d6
| 358728 ||  || — || February 3, 2008 || Kitt Peak || Spacewatch || — || align=right | 2.6 km || 
|-id=729 bgcolor=#E9E9E9
| 358729 ||  || — || February 6, 2008 || Anderson Mesa || LONEOS || — || align=right | 2.9 km || 
|-id=730 bgcolor=#E9E9E9
| 358730 ||  || — || February 6, 2008 || Suno || Suno Obs. || GEF || align=right | 1.4 km || 
|-id=731 bgcolor=#E9E9E9
| 358731 ||  || — || February 2, 2008 || Kitt Peak || Spacewatch || — || align=right | 1.9 km || 
|-id=732 bgcolor=#E9E9E9
| 358732 ||  || — || February 2, 2008 || Kitt Peak || Spacewatch || — || align=right | 3.1 km || 
|-id=733 bgcolor=#d6d6d6
| 358733 ||  || — || February 2, 2008 || Kitt Peak || Spacewatch || KOR || align=right | 1.4 km || 
|-id=734 bgcolor=#E9E9E9
| 358734 ||  || — || February 2, 2008 || Mount Lemmon || Mount Lemmon Survey || — || align=right | 2.7 km || 
|-id=735 bgcolor=#E9E9E9
| 358735 ||  || — || February 2, 2008 || Kitt Peak || Spacewatch || — || align=right | 2.9 km || 
|-id=736 bgcolor=#d6d6d6
| 358736 ||  || — || February 2, 2008 || Kitt Peak || Spacewatch || — || align=right | 3.2 km || 
|-id=737 bgcolor=#E9E9E9
| 358737 ||  || — || February 2, 2008 || Kitt Peak || Spacewatch || — || align=right | 5.3 km || 
|-id=738 bgcolor=#d6d6d6
| 358738 ||  || — || February 7, 2008 || Kitt Peak || Spacewatch || — || align=right | 2.7 km || 
|-id=739 bgcolor=#E9E9E9
| 358739 ||  || — || August 21, 2006 || Kitt Peak || Spacewatch || MRX || align=right data-sort-value="0.98" | 980 m || 
|-id=740 bgcolor=#E9E9E9
| 358740 ||  || — || February 7, 2008 || Kitt Peak || Spacewatch || ADE || align=right | 2.5 km || 
|-id=741 bgcolor=#E9E9E9
| 358741 ||  || — || February 7, 2008 || Kitt Peak || Spacewatch || — || align=right | 2.5 km || 
|-id=742 bgcolor=#E9E9E9
| 358742 ||  || — || February 8, 2008 || Mount Lemmon || Mount Lemmon Survey || NEM || align=right | 2.7 km || 
|-id=743 bgcolor=#E9E9E9
| 358743 ||  || — || February 9, 2008 || Kitt Peak || Spacewatch || — || align=right | 1.9 km || 
|-id=744 bgcolor=#FFC2E0
| 358744 ||  || — || February 10, 2008 || Kitt Peak || Spacewatch || APOPHA || align=right data-sort-value="0.57" | 570 m || 
|-id=745 bgcolor=#E9E9E9
| 358745 ||  || — || February 6, 2008 || Catalina || CSS || — || align=right | 2.1 km || 
|-id=746 bgcolor=#E9E9E9
| 358746 ||  || — || February 7, 2008 || Mount Lemmon || Mount Lemmon Survey || — || align=right | 2.7 km || 
|-id=747 bgcolor=#E9E9E9
| 358747 ||  || — || February 8, 2008 || Kitt Peak || Spacewatch || — || align=right | 2.1 km || 
|-id=748 bgcolor=#E9E9E9
| 358748 ||  || — || February 8, 2008 || Kitt Peak || Spacewatch || — || align=right | 2.4 km || 
|-id=749 bgcolor=#E9E9E9
| 358749 ||  || — || February 8, 2008 || Kitt Peak || Spacewatch || AGN || align=right | 1.5 km || 
|-id=750 bgcolor=#d6d6d6
| 358750 ||  || — || February 8, 2008 || Kitt Peak || Spacewatch || — || align=right | 2.6 km || 
|-id=751 bgcolor=#d6d6d6
| 358751 ||  || — || February 8, 2008 || Kitt Peak || Spacewatch || — || align=right | 2.5 km || 
|-id=752 bgcolor=#E9E9E9
| 358752 ||  || — || February 9, 2008 || Kitt Peak || Spacewatch || — || align=right | 3.0 km || 
|-id=753 bgcolor=#d6d6d6
| 358753 ||  || — || February 9, 2008 || Kitt Peak || Spacewatch || — || align=right | 2.9 km || 
|-id=754 bgcolor=#E9E9E9
| 358754 ||  || — || February 12, 2008 || Kitt Peak || Spacewatch || — || align=right | 3.6 km || 
|-id=755 bgcolor=#E9E9E9
| 358755 ||  || — || February 7, 2008 || Socorro || LINEAR || GEF || align=right | 1.6 km || 
|-id=756 bgcolor=#E9E9E9
| 358756 ||  || — || January 11, 2008 || Lulin || LUSS || — || align=right | 3.3 km || 
|-id=757 bgcolor=#d6d6d6
| 358757 ||  || — || November 20, 2007 || Mount Lemmon || Mount Lemmon Survey || — || align=right | 3.2 km || 
|-id=758 bgcolor=#d6d6d6
| 358758 ||  || — || July 29, 2005 || Palomar || NEAT || 615 || align=right | 2.0 km || 
|-id=759 bgcolor=#d6d6d6
| 358759 ||  || — || February 14, 2008 || Catalina || CSS || — || align=right | 4.1 km || 
|-id=760 bgcolor=#fefefe
| 358760 ||  || — || February 12, 2008 || Mount Lemmon || Mount Lemmon Survey || H || align=right data-sort-value="0.75" | 750 m || 
|-id=761 bgcolor=#d6d6d6
| 358761 ||  || — || February 13, 2008 || Mount Lemmon || Mount Lemmon Survey || — || align=right | 3.1 km || 
|-id=762 bgcolor=#d6d6d6
| 358762 ||  || — || February 8, 2008 || Kitt Peak || Spacewatch || — || align=right | 2.1 km || 
|-id=763 bgcolor=#d6d6d6
| 358763 ||  || — || February 8, 2008 || Kitt Peak || Spacewatch || — || align=right | 2.7 km || 
|-id=764 bgcolor=#d6d6d6
| 358764 ||  || — || February 7, 2008 || Kitt Peak || Spacewatch || — || align=right | 3.2 km || 
|-id=765 bgcolor=#d6d6d6
| 358765 ||  || — || February 14, 2008 || Mount Lemmon || Mount Lemmon Survey || ALA || align=right | 3.8 km || 
|-id=766 bgcolor=#d6d6d6
| 358766 ||  || — || February 27, 2008 || Piszkéstető || K. Sárneczky || — || align=right | 2.4 km || 
|-id=767 bgcolor=#E9E9E9
| 358767 ||  || — || February 24, 2008 || Kitt Peak || Spacewatch || XIZ || align=right | 1.7 km || 
|-id=768 bgcolor=#E9E9E9
| 358768 ||  || — || February 25, 2008 || Kitt Peak || Spacewatch || — || align=right | 2.6 km || 
|-id=769 bgcolor=#d6d6d6
| 358769 ||  || — || February 26, 2008 || Mount Lemmon || Mount Lemmon Survey || EUP || align=right | 3.7 km || 
|-id=770 bgcolor=#d6d6d6
| 358770 ||  || — || February 26, 2008 || Mount Lemmon || Mount Lemmon Survey || — || align=right | 3.3 km || 
|-id=771 bgcolor=#E9E9E9
| 358771 ||  || — || October 18, 2007 || Mount Lemmon || Mount Lemmon Survey || — || align=right | 2.7 km || 
|-id=772 bgcolor=#E9E9E9
| 358772 ||  || — || February 25, 2008 || Mount Lemmon || Mount Lemmon Survey || AGN || align=right | 1.2 km || 
|-id=773 bgcolor=#d6d6d6
| 358773 ||  || — || February 27, 2008 || Kitt Peak || Spacewatch || — || align=right | 2.8 km || 
|-id=774 bgcolor=#d6d6d6
| 358774 ||  || — || February 27, 2008 || Kitt Peak || Spacewatch || — || align=right | 3.0 km || 
|-id=775 bgcolor=#E9E9E9
| 358775 ||  || — || February 28, 2008 || Kitt Peak || Spacewatch || — || align=right | 2.6 km || 
|-id=776 bgcolor=#d6d6d6
| 358776 ||  || — || February 28, 2008 || Mount Lemmon || Mount Lemmon Survey || — || align=right | 2.7 km || 
|-id=777 bgcolor=#d6d6d6
| 358777 ||  || — || February 8, 2008 || Kitt Peak || Spacewatch || — || align=right | 4.5 km || 
|-id=778 bgcolor=#d6d6d6
| 358778 ||  || — || February 29, 2008 || Catalina || CSS || — || align=right | 3.9 km || 
|-id=779 bgcolor=#d6d6d6
| 358779 ||  || — || February 28, 2008 || Mount Lemmon || Mount Lemmon Survey || — || align=right | 2.4 km || 
|-id=780 bgcolor=#E9E9E9
| 358780 ||  || — || February 28, 2008 || Mount Lemmon || Mount Lemmon Survey || — || align=right | 2.1 km || 
|-id=781 bgcolor=#d6d6d6
| 358781 ||  || — || February 28, 2008 || Kitt Peak || Spacewatch || — || align=right | 3.3 km || 
|-id=782 bgcolor=#d6d6d6
| 358782 ||  || — || February 28, 2008 || Mount Lemmon || Mount Lemmon Survey || — || align=right | 2.3 km || 
|-id=783 bgcolor=#d6d6d6
| 358783 ||  || — || February 28, 2008 || Kitt Peak || Spacewatch || — || align=right | 3.1 km || 
|-id=784 bgcolor=#d6d6d6
| 358784 ||  || — || February 28, 2008 || Kitt Peak || Spacewatch || — || align=right | 3.3 km || 
|-id=785 bgcolor=#d6d6d6
| 358785 ||  || — || February 28, 2008 || Kitt Peak || Spacewatch || — || align=right | 2.8 km || 
|-id=786 bgcolor=#fefefe
| 358786 ||  || — || February 27, 2008 || Kitt Peak || Spacewatch || H || align=right data-sort-value="0.84" | 840 m || 
|-id=787 bgcolor=#d6d6d6
| 358787 ||  || — || August 30, 2005 || Kitt Peak || Spacewatch || KOR || align=right | 1.6 km || 
|-id=788 bgcolor=#d6d6d6
| 358788 ||  || — || March 1, 2008 || Kitt Peak || Spacewatch || — || align=right | 3.0 km || 
|-id=789 bgcolor=#d6d6d6
| 358789 ||  || — || March 1, 2008 || Kitt Peak || Spacewatch || — || align=right | 3.2 km || 
|-id=790 bgcolor=#d6d6d6
| 358790 ||  || — || March 1, 2008 || Kitt Peak || Spacewatch || EOS || align=right | 2.0 km || 
|-id=791 bgcolor=#d6d6d6
| 358791 ||  || — || March 1, 2008 || Kitt Peak || Spacewatch || — || align=right | 2.4 km || 
|-id=792 bgcolor=#d6d6d6
| 358792 ||  || — || March 2, 2008 || Kitt Peak || Spacewatch || — || align=right | 3.4 km || 
|-id=793 bgcolor=#E9E9E9
| 358793 ||  || — || March 3, 2008 || Purple Mountain || PMO NEO || — || align=right | 2.5 km || 
|-id=794 bgcolor=#d6d6d6
| 358794 ||  || — || February 12, 2008 || Mount Lemmon || Mount Lemmon Survey || — || align=right | 3.6 km || 
|-id=795 bgcolor=#d6d6d6
| 358795 ||  || — || March 5, 2008 || Kitt Peak || Spacewatch || — || align=right | 3.0 km || 
|-id=796 bgcolor=#d6d6d6
| 358796 ||  || — || March 5, 2008 || Kitt Peak || Spacewatch || EMA || align=right | 3.8 km || 
|-id=797 bgcolor=#d6d6d6
| 358797 ||  || — || March 6, 2008 || Kitt Peak || Spacewatch || — || align=right | 3.3 km || 
|-id=798 bgcolor=#E9E9E9
| 358798 ||  || — || March 6, 2008 || Mount Lemmon || Mount Lemmon Survey || WIT || align=right | 1.1 km || 
|-id=799 bgcolor=#d6d6d6
| 358799 ||  || — || March 6, 2008 || Kitt Peak || Spacewatch || — || align=right | 2.8 km || 
|-id=800 bgcolor=#d6d6d6
| 358800 ||  || — || March 7, 2008 || Catalina || CSS || — || align=right | 2.6 km || 
|}

358801–358900 

|-bgcolor=#d6d6d6
| 358801 ||  || — || August 28, 2005 || Kitt Peak || Spacewatch || KOR || align=right | 1.5 km || 
|-id=802 bgcolor=#d6d6d6
| 358802 ||  || — || March 9, 2008 || Mount Lemmon || Mount Lemmon Survey || — || align=right | 3.0 km || 
|-id=803 bgcolor=#d6d6d6
| 358803 ||  || — || January 11, 2008 || Mount Lemmon || Mount Lemmon Survey || EOS || align=right | 2.0 km || 
|-id=804 bgcolor=#d6d6d6
| 358804 ||  || — || March 7, 2008 || Kitt Peak || Spacewatch || — || align=right | 2.6 km || 
|-id=805 bgcolor=#d6d6d6
| 358805 ||  || — || March 8, 2008 || Mount Lemmon || Mount Lemmon Survey || — || align=right | 2.9 km || 
|-id=806 bgcolor=#d6d6d6
| 358806 ||  || — || March 8, 2008 || Catalina || CSS || — || align=right | 2.9 km || 
|-id=807 bgcolor=#d6d6d6
| 358807 ||  || — || February 7, 2008 || Mount Lemmon || Mount Lemmon Survey || — || align=right | 3.1 km || 
|-id=808 bgcolor=#d6d6d6
| 358808 ||  || — || March 10, 2008 || Kitt Peak || Spacewatch || CHA || align=right | 2.3 km || 
|-id=809 bgcolor=#d6d6d6
| 358809 ||  || — || March 8, 2008 || Socorro || LINEAR || — || align=right | 4.2 km || 
|-id=810 bgcolor=#d6d6d6
| 358810 ||  || — || April 28, 2003 || Anderson Mesa || LONEOS || — || align=right | 4.3 km || 
|-id=811 bgcolor=#d6d6d6
| 358811 ||  || — || March 8, 2008 || Kitt Peak || Spacewatch || CHA || align=right | 2.5 km || 
|-id=812 bgcolor=#d6d6d6
| 358812 ||  || — || March 8, 2008 || Kitt Peak || Spacewatch || EOS || align=right | 1.9 km || 
|-id=813 bgcolor=#d6d6d6
| 358813 ||  || — || March 8, 2008 || Kitt Peak || Spacewatch || — || align=right | 2.3 km || 
|-id=814 bgcolor=#E9E9E9
| 358814 ||  || — || March 9, 2008 || Mount Lemmon || Mount Lemmon Survey || — || align=right | 2.4 km || 
|-id=815 bgcolor=#d6d6d6
| 358815 ||  || — || September 11, 2005 || Kitt Peak || Spacewatch || URS || align=right | 2.9 km || 
|-id=816 bgcolor=#d6d6d6
| 358816 ||  || — || February 28, 2008 || Kitt Peak || Spacewatch || EOS || align=right | 2.1 km || 
|-id=817 bgcolor=#E9E9E9
| 358817 ||  || — || March 10, 2008 || Kitt Peak || Spacewatch || — || align=right | 2.3 km || 
|-id=818 bgcolor=#d6d6d6
| 358818 ||  || — || March 10, 2008 || Mount Lemmon || Mount Lemmon Survey || CHA || align=right | 2.0 km || 
|-id=819 bgcolor=#d6d6d6
| 358819 ||  || — || March 10, 2008 || Kitt Peak || Spacewatch || — || align=right | 2.5 km || 
|-id=820 bgcolor=#d6d6d6
| 358820 ||  || — || March 13, 2008 || Catalina || CSS || — || align=right | 3.1 km || 
|-id=821 bgcolor=#d6d6d6
| 358821 ||  || — || March 6, 2008 || Mount Lemmon || Mount Lemmon Survey || — || align=right | 3.2 km || 
|-id=822 bgcolor=#d6d6d6
| 358822 ||  || — || March 2, 2008 || Kitt Peak || Spacewatch || — || align=right | 3.7 km || 
|-id=823 bgcolor=#d6d6d6
| 358823 ||  || — || March 5, 2008 || Kitt Peak || Spacewatch || — || align=right | 2.7 km || 
|-id=824 bgcolor=#d6d6d6
| 358824 ||  || — || March 10, 2008 || Mount Lemmon || Mount Lemmon Survey || — || align=right | 3.2 km || 
|-id=825 bgcolor=#d6d6d6
| 358825 ||  || — || March 12, 2008 || Kitt Peak || Spacewatch || — || align=right | 2.0 km || 
|-id=826 bgcolor=#d6d6d6
| 358826 ||  || — || March 13, 2008 || Kitt Peak || Spacewatch || — || align=right | 2.5 km || 
|-id=827 bgcolor=#d6d6d6
| 358827 ||  || — || March 1, 2008 || Kitt Peak || Spacewatch || — || align=right | 3.7 km || 
|-id=828 bgcolor=#d6d6d6
| 358828 ||  || — || March 12, 2008 || Kitt Peak || Spacewatch || — || align=right | 2.5 km || 
|-id=829 bgcolor=#d6d6d6
| 358829 ||  || — || March 1, 2008 || Kitt Peak || Spacewatch || — || align=right | 2.5 km || 
|-id=830 bgcolor=#d6d6d6
| 358830 ||  || — || March 1, 2008 || Kitt Peak || Spacewatch || KOR || align=right | 1.5 km || 
|-id=831 bgcolor=#d6d6d6
| 358831 ||  || — || March 2, 2008 || Kitt Peak || Spacewatch || — || align=right | 2.9 km || 
|-id=832 bgcolor=#d6d6d6
| 358832 ||  || — || March 2, 2008 || Kitt Peak || Spacewatch || — || align=right | 3.0 km || 
|-id=833 bgcolor=#d6d6d6
| 358833 ||  || — || March 10, 2008 || Kitt Peak || Spacewatch || EOS || align=right | 4.8 km || 
|-id=834 bgcolor=#d6d6d6
| 358834 ||  || — || March 25, 2008 || Kitt Peak || Spacewatch || — || align=right | 2.9 km || 
|-id=835 bgcolor=#d6d6d6
| 358835 ||  || — || March 26, 2008 || Kitt Peak || Spacewatch || ANF || align=right | 1.5 km || 
|-id=836 bgcolor=#d6d6d6
| 358836 ||  || — || March 27, 2008 || Mount Lemmon || Mount Lemmon Survey || — || align=right | 2.4 km || 
|-id=837 bgcolor=#d6d6d6
| 358837 ||  || — || March 27, 2008 || Kitt Peak || Spacewatch || — || align=right | 4.5 km || 
|-id=838 bgcolor=#d6d6d6
| 358838 ||  || — || March 27, 2008 || Kitt Peak || Spacewatch || — || align=right | 4.5 km || 
|-id=839 bgcolor=#d6d6d6
| 358839 ||  || — || March 28, 2008 || Kitt Peak || Spacewatch || — || align=right | 2.9 km || 
|-id=840 bgcolor=#E9E9E9
| 358840 ||  || — || March 28, 2008 || Mount Lemmon || Mount Lemmon Survey || AGN || align=right | 1.2 km || 
|-id=841 bgcolor=#d6d6d6
| 358841 ||  || — || March 28, 2008 || Mount Lemmon || Mount Lemmon Survey || — || align=right | 2.9 km || 
|-id=842 bgcolor=#d6d6d6
| 358842 ||  || — || March 28, 2008 || Mount Lemmon || Mount Lemmon Survey || — || align=right | 2.5 km || 
|-id=843 bgcolor=#d6d6d6
| 358843 ||  || — || March 28, 2008 || Kitt Peak || Spacewatch || CHA || align=right | 2.6 km || 
|-id=844 bgcolor=#d6d6d6
| 358844 ||  || — || March 28, 2008 || Mount Lemmon || Mount Lemmon Survey || TIR || align=right | 3.4 km || 
|-id=845 bgcolor=#d6d6d6
| 358845 ||  || — || March 28, 2008 || Mount Lemmon || Mount Lemmon Survey || KOR || align=right | 1.4 km || 
|-id=846 bgcolor=#d6d6d6
| 358846 ||  || — || March 27, 2008 || Kitt Peak || Spacewatch || KOR || align=right | 1.3 km || 
|-id=847 bgcolor=#d6d6d6
| 358847 ||  || — || March 27, 2008 || Kitt Peak || Spacewatch || — || align=right | 2.1 km || 
|-id=848 bgcolor=#d6d6d6
| 358848 ||  || — || March 27, 2008 || Lulin || LUSS || — || align=right | 3.8 km || 
|-id=849 bgcolor=#fefefe
| 358849 ||  || — || March 28, 2008 || Kitt Peak || Spacewatch || H || align=right data-sort-value="0.71" | 710 m || 
|-id=850 bgcolor=#d6d6d6
| 358850 ||  || — || March 28, 2008 || Kitt Peak || Spacewatch || — || align=right | 3.2 km || 
|-id=851 bgcolor=#d6d6d6
| 358851 ||  || — || March 30, 2008 || Kitt Peak || Spacewatch || EOS || align=right | 1.9 km || 
|-id=852 bgcolor=#E9E9E9
| 358852 ||  || — || March 30, 2008 || Socorro || LINEAR || — || align=right | 2.8 km || 
|-id=853 bgcolor=#d6d6d6
| 358853 ||  || — || March 27, 2008 || Mount Lemmon || Mount Lemmon Survey || — || align=right | 2.4 km || 
|-id=854 bgcolor=#d6d6d6
| 358854 ||  || — || March 27, 2008 || Mount Lemmon || Mount Lemmon Survey || — || align=right | 3.6 km || 
|-id=855 bgcolor=#d6d6d6
| 358855 ||  || — || March 27, 2008 || Mount Lemmon || Mount Lemmon Survey || — || align=right | 2.2 km || 
|-id=856 bgcolor=#d6d6d6
| 358856 ||  || — || March 28, 2008 || Mount Lemmon || Mount Lemmon Survey || — || align=right | 2.7 km || 
|-id=857 bgcolor=#d6d6d6
| 358857 ||  || — || March 28, 2008 || Mount Lemmon || Mount Lemmon Survey || — || align=right | 3.2 km || 
|-id=858 bgcolor=#d6d6d6
| 358858 ||  || — || March 28, 2008 || Mount Lemmon || Mount Lemmon Survey || — || align=right | 2.5 km || 
|-id=859 bgcolor=#d6d6d6
| 358859 ||  || — || March 30, 2008 || Kitt Peak || Spacewatch || — || align=right | 2.6 km || 
|-id=860 bgcolor=#d6d6d6
| 358860 ||  || — || March 30, 2008 || Kitt Peak || Spacewatch || — || align=right | 2.9 km || 
|-id=861 bgcolor=#d6d6d6
| 358861 ||  || — || March 30, 2008 || Kitt Peak || Spacewatch || — || align=right | 4.2 km || 
|-id=862 bgcolor=#d6d6d6
| 358862 ||  || — || March 30, 2008 || Kitt Peak || Spacewatch || HYG || align=right | 3.1 km || 
|-id=863 bgcolor=#d6d6d6
| 358863 ||  || — || March 30, 2008 || Kitt Peak || Spacewatch || — || align=right | 2.9 km || 
|-id=864 bgcolor=#d6d6d6
| 358864 ||  || — || March 31, 2008 || Kitt Peak || Spacewatch || — || align=right | 2.5 km || 
|-id=865 bgcolor=#d6d6d6
| 358865 ||  || — || March 31, 2008 || Kitt Peak || Spacewatch || — || align=right | 2.8 km || 
|-id=866 bgcolor=#d6d6d6
| 358866 ||  || — || March 31, 2008 || Kitt Peak || Spacewatch || — || align=right | 3.0 km || 
|-id=867 bgcolor=#d6d6d6
| 358867 ||  || — || March 31, 2008 || Mount Lemmon || Mount Lemmon Survey || — || align=right | 2.9 km || 
|-id=868 bgcolor=#d6d6d6
| 358868 ||  || — || February 13, 2008 || Mount Lemmon || Mount Lemmon Survey || — || align=right | 4.1 km || 
|-id=869 bgcolor=#d6d6d6
| 358869 ||  || — || March 31, 2008 || Kitt Peak || Spacewatch || VER || align=right | 3.3 km || 
|-id=870 bgcolor=#d6d6d6
| 358870 ||  || — || March 31, 2008 || Mount Lemmon || Mount Lemmon Survey || EOS || align=right | 2.3 km || 
|-id=871 bgcolor=#d6d6d6
| 358871 ||  || — || March 28, 2008 || Mount Lemmon || Mount Lemmon Survey || — || align=right | 4.4 km || 
|-id=872 bgcolor=#d6d6d6
| 358872 ||  || — || March 28, 2008 || Kitt Peak || Spacewatch || HYG || align=right | 2.7 km || 
|-id=873 bgcolor=#d6d6d6
| 358873 ||  || — || March 29, 2008 || Kitt Peak || Spacewatch || — || align=right | 4.0 km || 
|-id=874 bgcolor=#d6d6d6
| 358874 ||  || — || March 31, 2008 || Kitt Peak || Spacewatch || — || align=right | 3.3 km || 
|-id=875 bgcolor=#d6d6d6
| 358875 ||  || — || March 29, 2008 || Kitt Peak || Spacewatch || — || align=right | 3.2 km || 
|-id=876 bgcolor=#d6d6d6
| 358876 ||  || — || March 30, 2008 || Kitt Peak || Spacewatch || — || align=right | 2.6 km || 
|-id=877 bgcolor=#d6d6d6
| 358877 ||  || — || March 28, 2008 || Kitt Peak || Spacewatch || — || align=right | 4.5 km || 
|-id=878 bgcolor=#d6d6d6
| 358878 ||  || — || October 6, 2000 || Kitt Peak || Spacewatch || — || align=right | 2.4 km || 
|-id=879 bgcolor=#d6d6d6
| 358879 ||  || — || March 28, 2008 || Mount Lemmon || Mount Lemmon Survey || HYG || align=right | 2.5 km || 
|-id=880 bgcolor=#d6d6d6
| 358880 ||  || — || March 30, 2008 || Kitt Peak || Spacewatch || — || align=right | 3.0 km || 
|-id=881 bgcolor=#d6d6d6
| 358881 ||  || — || April 8, 2008 || Mayhill || A. Lowe || — || align=right | 4.2 km || 
|-id=882 bgcolor=#d6d6d6
| 358882 ||  || — || April 1, 2008 || Kitt Peak || Spacewatch || — || align=right | 5.0 km || 
|-id=883 bgcolor=#d6d6d6
| 358883 ||  || — || April 4, 2008 || Kitt Peak || Spacewatch || KOR || align=right | 1.7 km || 
|-id=884 bgcolor=#d6d6d6
| 358884 ||  || — || April 4, 2008 || Mount Lemmon || Mount Lemmon Survey || — || align=right | 3.1 km || 
|-id=885 bgcolor=#d6d6d6
| 358885 ||  || — || October 30, 2005 || Kitt Peak || Spacewatch || — || align=right | 3.6 km || 
|-id=886 bgcolor=#d6d6d6
| 358886 ||  || — || April 1, 2008 || Mount Lemmon || Mount Lemmon Survey || — || align=right | 2.9 km || 
|-id=887 bgcolor=#d6d6d6
| 358887 ||  || — || April 3, 2008 || Kitt Peak || Spacewatch || — || align=right | 3.1 km || 
|-id=888 bgcolor=#d6d6d6
| 358888 ||  || — || April 3, 2008 || Mount Lemmon || Mount Lemmon Survey || — || align=right | 2.9 km || 
|-id=889 bgcolor=#d6d6d6
| 358889 ||  || — || April 3, 2008 || Kitt Peak || Spacewatch || — || align=right | 3.8 km || 
|-id=890 bgcolor=#d6d6d6
| 358890 ||  || — || April 3, 2008 || Kitt Peak || Spacewatch || — || align=right | 3.5 km || 
|-id=891 bgcolor=#d6d6d6
| 358891 ||  || — || April 3, 2008 || Mount Lemmon || Mount Lemmon Survey || HYG || align=right | 3.1 km || 
|-id=892 bgcolor=#d6d6d6
| 358892 ||  || — || April 4, 2008 || Kitt Peak || Spacewatch || TIR || align=right | 3.7 km || 
|-id=893 bgcolor=#d6d6d6
| 358893 ||  || — || April 4, 2008 || Kitt Peak || Spacewatch || HYG || align=right | 2.6 km || 
|-id=894 bgcolor=#d6d6d6
| 358894 Demetrescu ||  ||  || March 12, 2008 || La Silla || EURONEAR || EOS || align=right | 2.1 km || 
|-id=895 bgcolor=#d6d6d6
| 358895 ||  || — || April 4, 2008 || Kitt Peak || Spacewatch || — || align=right | 2.8 km || 
|-id=896 bgcolor=#d6d6d6
| 358896 ||  || — || March 6, 2008 || Mount Lemmon || Mount Lemmon Survey || — || align=right | 3.9 km || 
|-id=897 bgcolor=#d6d6d6
| 358897 ||  || — || April 5, 2008 || Kitt Peak || Spacewatch || — || align=right | 3.8 km || 
|-id=898 bgcolor=#d6d6d6
| 358898 ||  || — || April 5, 2008 || Kitt Peak || Spacewatch || — || align=right | 3.0 km || 
|-id=899 bgcolor=#d6d6d6
| 358899 ||  || — || March 10, 2008 || Kitt Peak || Spacewatch || — || align=right | 2.7 km || 
|-id=900 bgcolor=#d6d6d6
| 358900 ||  || — || April 5, 2008 || Mount Lemmon || Mount Lemmon Survey || — || align=right | 2.8 km || 
|}

358901–359000 

|-bgcolor=#d6d6d6
| 358901 ||  || — || March 12, 2008 || Kitt Peak || Spacewatch || — || align=right | 2.7 km || 
|-id=902 bgcolor=#d6d6d6
| 358902 ||  || — || March 10, 2008 || Mount Lemmon || Mount Lemmon Survey || — || align=right | 2.7 km || 
|-id=903 bgcolor=#d6d6d6
| 358903 ||  || — || March 4, 2008 || Mount Lemmon || Mount Lemmon Survey || — || align=right | 3.3 km || 
|-id=904 bgcolor=#d6d6d6
| 358904 ||  || — || April 6, 2008 || Kitt Peak || Spacewatch || 637 || align=right | 2.7 km || 
|-id=905 bgcolor=#d6d6d6
| 358905 ||  || — || December 13, 2006 || Mount Lemmon || Mount Lemmon Survey || — || align=right | 2.2 km || 
|-id=906 bgcolor=#d6d6d6
| 358906 ||  || — || April 7, 2008 || Mount Lemmon || Mount Lemmon Survey || — || align=right | 3.4 km || 
|-id=907 bgcolor=#d6d6d6
| 358907 ||  || — || April 8, 2008 || Kitt Peak || Spacewatch || HYG || align=right | 2.2 km || 
|-id=908 bgcolor=#d6d6d6
| 358908 ||  || — || April 9, 2008 || Kitt Peak || Spacewatch || THM || align=right | 2.3 km || 
|-id=909 bgcolor=#d6d6d6
| 358909 ||  || — || April 9, 2008 || Kitt Peak || Spacewatch || — || align=right | 2.4 km || 
|-id=910 bgcolor=#d6d6d6
| 358910 ||  || — || April 10, 2008 || Kitt Peak || Spacewatch || — || align=right | 3.4 km || 
|-id=911 bgcolor=#d6d6d6
| 358911 ||  || — || April 11, 2008 || Kitt Peak || Spacewatch || 628 || align=right | 2.0 km || 
|-id=912 bgcolor=#d6d6d6
| 358912 ||  || — || April 13, 2008 || Kitt Peak || Spacewatch || — || align=right | 3.2 km || 
|-id=913 bgcolor=#d6d6d6
| 358913 ||  || — || April 13, 2008 || Modra || Š. Gajdoš, J. Világi || — || align=right | 3.2 km || 
|-id=914 bgcolor=#d6d6d6
| 358914 ||  || — || April 15, 2008 || Catalina || CSS || EUP || align=right | 6.9 km || 
|-id=915 bgcolor=#d6d6d6
| 358915 ||  || — || April 4, 2008 || Mount Lemmon || Mount Lemmon Survey || — || align=right | 2.9 km || 
|-id=916 bgcolor=#d6d6d6
| 358916 ||  || — || April 7, 2008 || Kitt Peak || Spacewatch || — || align=right | 2.7 km || 
|-id=917 bgcolor=#d6d6d6
| 358917 ||  || — || April 9, 2008 || Kitt Peak || Spacewatch || — || align=right | 3.6 km || 
|-id=918 bgcolor=#d6d6d6
| 358918 ||  || — || April 6, 2008 || Kitt Peak || Spacewatch || THM || align=right | 2.4 km || 
|-id=919 bgcolor=#d6d6d6
| 358919 ||  || — || April 6, 2008 || Mount Lemmon || Mount Lemmon Survey || VER || align=right | 3.3 km || 
|-id=920 bgcolor=#d6d6d6
| 358920 ||  || — || April 3, 2008 || Mount Lemmon || Mount Lemmon Survey || EOS || align=right | 2.1 km || 
|-id=921 bgcolor=#d6d6d6
| 358921 ||  || — || April 24, 2008 || Mount Lemmon || Mount Lemmon Survey || EOS || align=right | 2.2 km || 
|-id=922 bgcolor=#d6d6d6
| 358922 ||  || — || April 24, 2008 || Kitt Peak || Spacewatch || — || align=right | 3.2 km || 
|-id=923 bgcolor=#d6d6d6
| 358923 ||  || — || February 21, 2002 || Kitt Peak || Spacewatch || HYG || align=right | 3.9 km || 
|-id=924 bgcolor=#d6d6d6
| 358924 ||  || — || April 25, 2008 || Kitt Peak || Spacewatch || — || align=right | 3.4 km || 
|-id=925 bgcolor=#d6d6d6
| 358925 ||  || — || April 25, 2008 || Kitt Peak || Spacewatch || — || align=right | 2.8 km || 
|-id=926 bgcolor=#d6d6d6
| 358926 ||  || — || April 26, 2008 || Kitt Peak || Spacewatch || — || align=right | 2.9 km || 
|-id=927 bgcolor=#d6d6d6
| 358927 ||  || — || April 14, 2008 || Mount Lemmon || Mount Lemmon Survey || THM || align=right | 1.9 km || 
|-id=928 bgcolor=#d6d6d6
| 358928 ||  || — || April 26, 2008 || Kitt Peak || Spacewatch || TIR || align=right | 3.8 km || 
|-id=929 bgcolor=#d6d6d6
| 358929 ||  || — || April 27, 2008 || Kitt Peak || Spacewatch || — || align=right | 3.4 km || 
|-id=930 bgcolor=#d6d6d6
| 358930 ||  || — || April 30, 2008 || Kitt Peak || Spacewatch || — || align=right | 3.7 km || 
|-id=931 bgcolor=#d6d6d6
| 358931 ||  || — || April 27, 2008 || Mount Lemmon || Mount Lemmon Survey || — || align=right | 2.8 km || 
|-id=932 bgcolor=#d6d6d6
| 358932 ||  || — || April 28, 2008 || Kitt Peak || Spacewatch || — || align=right | 3.3 km || 
|-id=933 bgcolor=#d6d6d6
| 358933 ||  || — || April 29, 2008 || Kitt Peak || Spacewatch || THM || align=right | 2.3 km || 
|-id=934 bgcolor=#d6d6d6
| 358934 ||  || — || April 29, 2008 || Kitt Peak || Spacewatch || VER || align=right | 2.6 km || 
|-id=935 bgcolor=#d6d6d6
| 358935 ||  || — || April 29, 2008 || Kitt Peak || Spacewatch || EOS || align=right | 2.2 km || 
|-id=936 bgcolor=#d6d6d6
| 358936 ||  || — || April 29, 2008 || Kitt Peak || Spacewatch || TIR || align=right | 3.2 km || 
|-id=937 bgcolor=#d6d6d6
| 358937 ||  || — || April 29, 2008 || Mount Lemmon || Mount Lemmon Survey || — || align=right | 3.7 km || 
|-id=938 bgcolor=#d6d6d6
| 358938 ||  || — || April 30, 2008 || Mount Lemmon || Mount Lemmon Survey || — || align=right | 2.7 km || 
|-id=939 bgcolor=#d6d6d6
| 358939 ||  || — || April 26, 2008 || Catalina || CSS || EUP || align=right | 5.4 km || 
|-id=940 bgcolor=#d6d6d6
| 358940 ||  || — || May 1, 2008 || Kitt Peak || Spacewatch || — || align=right | 3.4 km || 
|-id=941 bgcolor=#d6d6d6
| 358941 ||  || — || May 2, 2008 || Kitt Peak || Spacewatch || — || align=right | 3.4 km || 
|-id=942 bgcolor=#d6d6d6
| 358942 ||  || — || May 2, 2008 || Kitt Peak || Spacewatch || EOS || align=right | 2.3 km || 
|-id=943 bgcolor=#d6d6d6
| 358943 ||  || — || May 3, 2008 || Kitt Peak || Spacewatch || — || align=right | 2.3 km || 
|-id=944 bgcolor=#d6d6d6
| 358944 ||  || — || May 7, 2008 || Kitt Peak || Spacewatch || — || align=right | 4.0 km || 
|-id=945 bgcolor=#d6d6d6
| 358945 ||  || — || May 6, 2008 || Kitt Peak || Spacewatch || — || align=right | 3.8 km || 
|-id=946 bgcolor=#d6d6d6
| 358946 ||  || — || May 7, 2008 || Kitt Peak || Spacewatch || — || align=right | 3.6 km || 
|-id=947 bgcolor=#d6d6d6
| 358947 ||  || — || May 8, 2008 || Kitt Peak || Spacewatch || HYG || align=right | 2.2 km || 
|-id=948 bgcolor=#d6d6d6
| 358948 ||  || — || May 11, 2008 || Mount Lemmon || Mount Lemmon Survey || — || align=right | 2.9 km || 
|-id=949 bgcolor=#d6d6d6
| 358949 ||  || — || May 11, 2008 || Catalina || CSS || — || align=right | 3.6 km || 
|-id=950 bgcolor=#d6d6d6
| 358950 ||  || — || May 5, 2008 || Catalina || CSS || — || align=right | 3.1 km || 
|-id=951 bgcolor=#d6d6d6
| 358951 ||  || — || May 27, 2008 || Kitt Peak || Spacewatch || — || align=right | 2.9 km || 
|-id=952 bgcolor=#d6d6d6
| 358952 ||  || — || May 27, 2008 || Mount Lemmon || Mount Lemmon Survey || — || align=right | 3.4 km || 
|-id=953 bgcolor=#d6d6d6
| 358953 ||  || — || May 27, 2008 || Kitt Peak || Spacewatch || — || align=right | 3.0 km || 
|-id=954 bgcolor=#d6d6d6
| 358954 ||  || — || May 3, 2008 || Kitt Peak || Spacewatch || — || align=right | 3.2 km || 
|-id=955 bgcolor=#d6d6d6
| 358955 ||  || — || May 29, 2008 || Kitt Peak || Spacewatch || — || align=right | 2.9 km || 
|-id=956 bgcolor=#d6d6d6
| 358956 ||  || — || March 28, 2008 || Kitt Peak || Spacewatch || — || align=right | 3.6 km || 
|-id=957 bgcolor=#d6d6d6
| 358957 ||  || — || May 29, 2008 || Mount Lemmon || Mount Lemmon Survey || — || align=right | 2.7 km || 
|-id=958 bgcolor=#d6d6d6
| 358958 ||  || — || May 29, 2008 || Kitt Peak || Spacewatch || EUP || align=right | 3.0 km || 
|-id=959 bgcolor=#d6d6d6
| 358959 ||  || — || May 31, 2008 || Kitt Peak || Spacewatch || VER || align=right | 4.6 km || 
|-id=960 bgcolor=#d6d6d6
| 358960 ||  || — || June 2, 2008 || Mount Lemmon || Mount Lemmon Survey || — || align=right | 3.3 km || 
|-id=961 bgcolor=#d6d6d6
| 358961 ||  || — || June 8, 2008 || Kitt Peak || Spacewatch || EOS || align=right | 2.4 km || 
|-id=962 bgcolor=#d6d6d6
| 358962 ||  || — || February 20, 2002 || Kitt Peak || Spacewatch || EOS || align=right | 4.4 km || 
|-id=963 bgcolor=#d6d6d6
| 358963 ||  || — || July 2, 2008 || La Sagra || OAM Obs. || ALA || align=right | 5.5 km || 
|-id=964 bgcolor=#fefefe
| 358964 ||  || — || August 21, 2008 || Kitt Peak || Spacewatch || — || align=right data-sort-value="0.56" | 560 m || 
|-id=965 bgcolor=#fefefe
| 358965 ||  || — || September 3, 2008 || Kitt Peak || Spacewatch || — || align=right data-sort-value="0.71" | 710 m || 
|-id=966 bgcolor=#C2FFFF
| 358966 ||  || — || September 4, 2008 || Kitt Peak || Spacewatch || L4 || align=right | 7.5 km || 
|-id=967 bgcolor=#fefefe
| 358967 ||  || — || September 8, 2008 || Dauban || F. Kugel || FLO || align=right data-sort-value="0.58" | 580 m || 
|-id=968 bgcolor=#C2FFFF
| 358968 ||  || — || September 6, 2008 || Kitt Peak || Spacewatch || L4 || align=right | 7.7 km || 
|-id=969 bgcolor=#fefefe
| 358969 ||  || — || September 7, 2008 || Mount Lemmon || Mount Lemmon Survey || NYS || align=right data-sort-value="0.64" | 640 m || 
|-id=970 bgcolor=#fefefe
| 358970 ||  || — || September 6, 2008 || Mount Lemmon || Mount Lemmon Survey || — || align=right data-sort-value="0.74" | 740 m || 
|-id=971 bgcolor=#C2FFFF
| 358971 ||  || — || September 5, 2008 || Kitt Peak || Spacewatch || L4 || align=right | 8.4 km || 
|-id=972 bgcolor=#d6d6d6
| 358972 ||  || — || September 5, 2008 || Kitt Peak || Spacewatch || 3:2 || align=right | 7.9 km || 
|-id=973 bgcolor=#fefefe
| 358973 ||  || — || September 6, 2008 || Mount Lemmon || Mount Lemmon Survey || — || align=right data-sort-value="0.90" | 900 m || 
|-id=974 bgcolor=#fefefe
| 358974 ||  || — || September 23, 2008 || Goodricke-Pigott || R. A. Tucker || — || align=right data-sort-value="0.69" | 690 m || 
|-id=975 bgcolor=#C2FFFF
| 358975 ||  || — || September 19, 2008 || Kitt Peak || Spacewatch || L4 || align=right | 7.8 km || 
|-id=976 bgcolor=#C2FFFF
| 358976 ||  || — || September 20, 2008 || Kitt Peak || Spacewatch || L4 || align=right | 12 km || 
|-id=977 bgcolor=#C2FFFF
| 358977 ||  || — || September 23, 2008 || Mount Lemmon || Mount Lemmon Survey || L4 || align=right | 8.6 km || 
|-id=978 bgcolor=#fefefe
| 358978 ||  || — || September 27, 2008 || Altschwendt || W. Ries || — || align=right data-sort-value="0.71" | 710 m || 
|-id=979 bgcolor=#fefefe
| 358979 ||  || — || September 20, 2008 || Mount Lemmon || Mount Lemmon Survey || — || align=right data-sort-value="0.85" | 850 m || 
|-id=980 bgcolor=#fefefe
| 358980 ||  || — || September 22, 2008 || Kitt Peak || Spacewatch || MAS || align=right data-sort-value="0.72" | 720 m || 
|-id=981 bgcolor=#C2FFFF
| 358981 ||  || — || September 8, 2008 || Kitt Peak || Spacewatch || L4 || align=right | 8.5 km || 
|-id=982 bgcolor=#fefefe
| 358982 ||  || — || September 22, 2008 || Mount Lemmon || Mount Lemmon Survey || — || align=right data-sort-value="0.68" | 680 m || 
|-id=983 bgcolor=#fefefe
| 358983 ||  || — || September 22, 2008 || Mount Lemmon || Mount Lemmon Survey || — || align=right data-sort-value="0.60" | 600 m || 
|-id=984 bgcolor=#fefefe
| 358984 ||  || — || September 22, 2008 || Kitt Peak || Spacewatch || — || align=right data-sort-value="0.58" | 580 m || 
|-id=985 bgcolor=#fefefe
| 358985 ||  || — || September 24, 2008 || Kitt Peak || Spacewatch || — || align=right data-sort-value="0.87" | 870 m || 
|-id=986 bgcolor=#fefefe
| 358986 ||  || — || September 23, 2008 || Socorro || LINEAR || — || align=right data-sort-value="0.85" | 850 m || 
|-id=987 bgcolor=#fefefe
| 358987 ||  || — || September 3, 2008 || Kitt Peak || Spacewatch || — || align=right data-sort-value="0.81" | 810 m || 
|-id=988 bgcolor=#C2FFFF
| 358988 ||  || — || September 29, 2008 || Mount Lemmon || Mount Lemmon Survey || L4 || align=right | 7.3 km || 
|-id=989 bgcolor=#C2FFFF
| 358989 ||  || — || September 28, 2008 || Mount Lemmon || Mount Lemmon Survey || L4 || align=right | 9.6 km || 
|-id=990 bgcolor=#fefefe
| 358990 ||  || — || September 23, 2008 || Mount Lemmon || Mount Lemmon Survey || — || align=right data-sort-value="0.83" | 830 m || 
|-id=991 bgcolor=#fefefe
| 358991 ||  || — || September 25, 2008 || Kitt Peak || Spacewatch || FLO || align=right data-sort-value="0.58" | 580 m || 
|-id=992 bgcolor=#C2FFFF
| 358992 ||  || — || September 23, 2008 || Kitt Peak || Spacewatch || L4 || align=right | 7.7 km || 
|-id=993 bgcolor=#C2FFFF
| 358993 ||  || — || September 23, 2008 || Kitt Peak || Spacewatch || L4 || align=right | 7.4 km || 
|-id=994 bgcolor=#C2FFFF
| 358994 ||  || — || September 22, 2008 || Mount Lemmon || Mount Lemmon Survey || L4 || align=right | 7.9 km || 
|-id=995 bgcolor=#fefefe
| 358995 ||  || — || September 23, 2008 || Kitt Peak || Spacewatch || — || align=right data-sort-value="0.62" | 620 m || 
|-id=996 bgcolor=#fefefe
| 358996 ||  || — || September 26, 2008 || Kitt Peak || Spacewatch || NYS || align=right data-sort-value="0.48" | 480 m || 
|-id=997 bgcolor=#fefefe
| 358997 ||  || — || October 3, 2008 || Socorro || LINEAR || — || align=right | 1.5 km || 
|-id=998 bgcolor=#fefefe
| 358998 ||  || — || October 3, 2008 || Kitt Peak || Spacewatch || — || align=right data-sort-value="0.64" | 640 m || 
|-id=999 bgcolor=#fefefe
| 358999 ||  || — || October 5, 2008 || La Sagra || OAM Obs. || — || align=right data-sort-value="0.68" | 680 m || 
|-id=000 bgcolor=#C2FFFF
| 359000 ||  || — || October 6, 2008 || Mount Lemmon || Mount Lemmon Survey || L4 || align=right | 8.7 km || 
|}

References

External links 
 Discovery Circumstances: Numbered Minor Planets (355001)–(360000) (IAU Minor Planet Center)

0358